This is a list of English-language poets, who have written much of their poetry in English. Main country of residence as a poet (not place of birth): A = Australia, Ag = Antigua, B = Barbados, Bo = Bosnia, C = Canada, Ch = Chile, Cu = Cuba, D = Dominica, De = Denmark, E = England, F = France, G = Germany, Ga = Gambia, Gd = Grenada, Gh = Ghana/Gold Coast, Gr = Greece, Gu = Guyana/British Guiana, Gy = Guernsey, HK = Hong Kong, In = India, IoM = Isle of Man, Is = Israel, Ir = Ireland, It = Italy, J = Jamaica, Je = Jersey, Jp = Japan, K = Kenya, L = Lebanon, M = Malta, Me = Mexico, Mo = Montserrat, Ne = Nepal, Nf = Newfoundland (colony), Ni = Nigeria, NI = Northern Ireland, Nt = Netherlands, NZ = New Zealand, P = Pakistan, Pa = Palestine, Ph = Philippines, PI = Pitcairn Islands, RE = Russian Empire, S = Scotland, SA = South Africa, Se = Serbia, SL = Saint Lucia, SLe = Sierra Leone, SLk = Sri Lanka, So = Somalia, Sw = Sweden, T = Trinidad and Tobago, US = United States/preceding colonies, W = Wales, Z = Zimbabwe/Rhodesia

A

Aa–Al
Jonathan Aaron (born 1941, US)
Chris Abani (born 1966, Ni/US)
Henry Abbey (1842–1911, US)
Eleanor Hallowell Abbott (1872–1958, US)
J. H. M. Abbott (1874–1953, A)
Lascelles Abercrombie (1881–1938, E)
Arthur Talmage Abernethy (1872–1956, US)
Mark Abley (born 1955, C)
James Aboud (born 1956, T)
Lionel Abrahams (1928–2004, SA)
Sam Abrams (born 1935, US)
Seth Abramson (born 1976, US)
Dannie Abse (1923–2014, W)
Chinua Achebe (1930–2013, Ni/US)
Catherine Obianuju Acholonu (1951–2014, Ni)
Kathy Acker (1947–1997, US)
Diane Ackerman (born 1948, US)
Duane Ackerson (born 1942, US)
Milton Acorn (1923–1986, C)
Harold Acton (1904–1994, E/It)
Gilbert Adair (1944–2011, S/F)
Virginia Hamilton Adair (1919–2004, US)
Helen Adam (1909–1993, S/US)
Jean Adam (1704–1765, S)
Arthur Henry Adams (1872–1936, NZ/A)
Douglas Adams (1952–2001, E)
John Adams (1704–1740, US)
Léonie Adams (1899–1988, US)
Ryan Adams (born 1974, US)
Gil Adamson (born 1961, C)
Robert Adamson (1943–2022, A)
Fleur Adcock (born 1934, NZ/E)
Joseph Addison (1672–1719, E)
Kim Addonizio (born 1954, US)
Bayo Adebowale] (born 1944, Ni)
Toyin Adewale-Gabriel (born 1969, Ni)
Opal Palmer Adisa (born 1954, J)
Tatamkhulu Afrika (1920–2002, SA)
John Agard (born 1949, Gu)
Patience Agbabi (born 1965, W/E)
Deborah Ager born 1978, US)
Kelli Russell Agodon (living, US)
Allan Ahlberg (1938–1994, E)
Ai (born 1947, US)
Ama Ata Aidoo (born 1940, Gh)
Conrad Aiken (1889–1973, US)
Douglas Ainslie (1865–1948, S)
Thomas Aird (1802–1876, S)
Adam Aitken (born 1960, A)
Neil Aitken (born 1974, C)
Funso Aiyejina (born 1949, Ni)
Tolu Ajayi (born 1946, Ni)
Mark Akenside (1721–1770, E)
Salman Akhtar (born 1946, In/US)
Tolu Akinyemi (living, Ni)
Alasdair MacMhaighstir Alasdair (c. 1695–1770, S)
Jordie Albiston (1961–2022, A)
Ammiel Alcalay (born 1956, US)
Amos Bronson Alcott (1799–1888, US)
Louisa May Alcott (1832–1888, US)
Kaye Aldenhoven (living, A)
Richard Aldington (1892–1962, E)
Elizabeth Alexander (born 1962, US)
Sidney A. Alexander (1866–1948, E)
William Alexander, 1st Earl of Stirling (c. 1567–1640, S)
Sherman Alexie (born 1966, US)
Felipe Alfau (1902–1999, US)
Edna Alford (born 1947, C)
Mike Alfred (living, SA)
Agha Shahid Ali (1949–2001, In/US)
James Alexander Allan (1889–1956, A)
Rob Allan (born 1945, NZ)
Sandra Alland (living, C/S)
Donna Allard (living, C)
William Allegrezza (born 1974, US)
Dick Allen (1939–2017, US)
Donald Allen (1912–2004, US)
Elizabeth Allen (living, A)
Elizabeth Akers Allen (1832–1911, US)
Leslie Holdsworth Allen (1879–1964, A)
Lillian Allen (born 1951, C)
Richard James Allen (born 1960, A)
Ron Allen (1947–2010, US)
Ellen Palmer Allerton (1835–1893, US)
William Allingham (1824/28–1889, Ir/E)
Washington Allston (1779–1843, US)
Anne-Marie Alonzo (1951–2005, C)
Alta (Alta Gerrey, born 1942, US)
Al Alvarez (1929–2019, E)
Ivy Alvarez (living, A)
Julia Alvarez (born 1950, D/US)
Moniza Alvi (born 1954, E)

Am–Az
George Amabile (born 1936, C)
Abdulkareem Baba Aminu (born 1977, Ni)
Kingsley Amis (1922–1995, E)
A. R. Ammons (1926–2001, US)
Madhur Anand (born 1971, C)
Ingrid Andersen (born 1965, SA)
Ethel Anderson (1883–1958, A)
Freddie Anderson (1922–2001, Ir/S)
J. Redwood Anderson (1883–1964, E)
Patrick Anderson (1915–1979, E/C)
Rod Anderson (born 1935, C)
Victor Henry Anderson (1917–2001, US)
Michael Andre (born 1946, C/US)
Bruce Andrews (born 1948, US)
Kevin Andrews (1924–1989, E/Gr)
Ron Androla (born 1954, US)
Ralph Angel (born 1951, US)
Maya Angelou (1928–2014, US)
James Stout Angus (1830–1923, S)
Marion Angus (1865–1946, S)
J. K. Annand (1908–1993, S)
David Antin (1932–2016, US)
Antler (born 1946, US)
Susanne Antonetta (born 1956, US)
Brother Antoninus (1912–1994, US)
Philip Appleman (1926–2020, US)
Richard Appleton (1932–2005, A)
Alexander Arbuthnot (1538–1583, S)
Walter Conrad Arensberg (1878–1954, US)
Rae Armantrout (born 1947, US)
Simon Armitage (born 1963, E)
Annie Armitt (1850–1933, E)
Richard Armour (1906–1989, US)
Jeannette Armstrong (born 1948, C)
Peter Armstrong (born 1957, E)
Tammy Armstrong (born 1974, C)
David Arnason (born 1940, C)
Craig Arnold (1967–2009, US)
Matthew Arnold (1822–1888, E)
Joanne Arnott (born 1960, C)
K. O. Arvidson (1938–2011, NZ)
M. K. Asante (born 1982, US)
John Ashbery (1927–2017, US)
Cliff Ashby (1919–2012, E)
Joseph Ashby-Sterry (1836 or 1838–1917, E)
Thomas Ashe (1836–1889, E)
Renée Ashley (living, US)
Anne Askew (1521–1546, E)
Timoshenko Aslanides (born 1943, A)
Herbert Asquith (1881–1947, E)
Thea Astley (1925–2004, A)
Tilly Aston (1873–1947, A)
Edwin Atherstone (1788–1872, E)
Cassandra Atherton (living, A)
Rupert Atkinson (1881–1961, A)
Tiffany Atkinson (born 1972, W)
Margaret Atwood (born 1939, C)
Dorothy Auchterlonie (1915–1991, A)
John Audelay (died c. 1426, E)
W. H. Auden (1907–1973, E/US)
William Auld (1924–2006, S)
Joseph Auslander (1897–1965, US)
Paul Auster (born 1947, US)
Alfred Austin (1835–1913, E)
Oana Avasilichioaei (living, C)
James Avery (born 1948, US)
Tusiata Avia (born 1966, NZ)
Margaret Avison (1918–2007, C)
Kofi Awoonor (1935–2013, Gh)
Ayo Ayoola-Amale (born 1970, Ni)
Pam Ayres (born 1947, E)
Sir Robert Aytoun (1570–1638, S/E)
William Edmondstoune Aytoun (1813–1865, S)
Nnorom Azuonye (born 1967, Ni)
Jody Azzouni (born 1954, US)

B

Ba
Ken Babstock (born 1970, C)
Peter Babyon (fl. 1317 – 1366, E)
Jimmy Santiago Baca (born 1952, US)
Bellamy Bach (group pseudonym, 1980s, US)
Joseph M. Bachelor (Joseph Morris, 1889–1947, US)
Elizabeth Bachinsky (born 1976, C)
Gabeba Baderoon (born 1969, SA)
Grace Shattuck Bail (1898–1996, US)
Alfred Bailey (1905–1997, C)
Jacob Bailey (1731–1808, US/C)
Kevin Bailey (born 1953, E)
Philip James Bailey (1816–1902, E)
Joanna Baillie (1762–1861, S/E)
David Baker (born 1954, US)
Henry Baker (1698–1774, E)
Marie Annharte Baker (born 1942, C)
Peter Bakowski (born 1954, A)
John Balaban (born 1943, US)
Jesse Ball (born 1978, US)
Addie L. Ballou (1838–1916, US)
Samuel Bamford (1788–1872, E)
John Banim (1798–1842, Ir/E)
Chris Banks (born 1970, C)
Russell Banks (born 1940, US)
Kaushalya Bannerji (living, C)
Anne Bannerman (1765–1829, S)
Frances Bannerman (1855–1944, C)
Lex Banning (1921–1965, A)
Ivy Bannister (born 1951, US/Ir)
Shabbir Banoobhai (born 1949, SA)
Amiri Baraka (1934–2014, US)
Anna Laetitia Barbauld (1743–1825, E)
Mary Barber (c. 1685 – c. 1755, Ir)
Ros Barber (born 1964, E)
Anna Laetitia Barbauld (1743–1825, E)
John Barbour (c. 1320–1395, S)
Alexander Barclay (1476–1552, S)
Leland Bardwell (1922–2016, Ir)
Serie Barford (living, NZ)
Richard Barham (Thomas Ingoldsby, 1788–1845, E)
George Barker (1913–1991, E)
Les Barker (born 1947, E)
Coleman Barks (born 1937, US)
Clement Barksdale (1609–1687, E)
Joel Barlow (1754–1812, US/F)
Lady Anne Barnard (1750–1825, S/SA)
Mary Barnard (1909–2002, US)
Djuna Barnes (1892–1982, US)
Stuart Barnes (born 1977, A)
William Barnes (1801–1886, E)
Annie Wall Barnett (1859-1942, US)
Catherine Barnett (born 1960, US)
Richard Barnfield (1574–1627, E)
Willis Barnstone (born 1927, US)
John Barr (1809–1889, S/NZ)
Miriam Barr (born 1982, NZ)
Laird Barron (born 1970, US)
Bernard Barton (1784–1849, E)
John Barton (born 1957, C)
Bertha Hirsch Baruch (later 19th – early 20th century, US)
Gary Barwin (born 1964, C)
Todd Bash (born 1965, US)
Michael Basinski (born 1950, US)
Shaunt Basmajian (1950–1990, C)
Ellen Bass (born 1947, US)
Arlo Bates (1850–1918, US)
David Bates (1809–1870, US)
H. E. Bates (1905–1974, E)
Katharine Lee Bates (1859–1929, US)
Joseph Bathanti (born 1953, US)
Dawn-Michelle Baude (born 1959, US)
Bill Bauer (1932–2010, US/C)
Edward Baugh (born 1936, J)
Charles Baxter (born 1947, US)
James K. Baxter (1926–1972, NZ)
Arthur Bayldon (1865–1958, A)
William Baylebridge (1883–1942, A)

Be–Bo
Eric Beach (born 1947, A)
Thomas Beach (died 1737, W)
John Beaglehole (1901–1971, NZ)
Anne Beale (1816–1900, E/W)
Doug Beardsley (born 1941, C)
James Beattie (1735–1803, S)
Jan Beatty (born 1952, US)
Derek Beaulieu (born 1973, C)
Francis Beaumont (1586–1616, E)
Bruce Beaver (1928–2004, A)
Samuel Beckett (1906–1989, Ir)
Joshua Beckman (living, US)
Thomas Lovell Beddoes (1803–1849, E/G)
Ruth Bedford (1882–1963, A)
Jack Bedson (born 1950, A)
Patricia Beer (1919–1999, E)
Ven Begamudré (born 1956, C)
Brendan Behan (1923–1964, Ir)
Aphra Behn (1640–1689, E)
Sinclair Beiles (1930–2000, SA)
Gerard Beirne (born 1962, Ir/C)
Henry Beissel (born 1929, G/C)
Billy-Ray Belcourt (living, C)
Ken Belford (born 1946, C)
Erin Belieu (born 1965, US)
J. J. Bell (1871–1934, S)
Julian Bell (1908–1937, E)
Marvin Bell (1937–2020, US)
Lisa Bellear (1961–2006, A)
Lesley Belleau (living, C)
Hilaire Belloc (1870–1953, E)
John Bemrose (living, C)
Gwen Benaway (born 1987, C)
Hester A. Benedict (1838-1921, US)
Stephen Vincent Benét (1898–1943, US)
William Rose Benét (1886–1950, US)
Elizabeth Benger (1775–1827, E)
Gwendolyn B. Bennett (1902–1981, US)
Jim Bennett (born 1951, E)
Louise Bennett-Coverley (1919–2006, J)
Robbie Benoit (died 2007, C)
A. C. Benson (1862–1925, E)
Richard Berengarten (born 1943, E)
Bill Berkson (1939–2016, US)
Charles Bernstein (born 1950, US)
Robert Berold (born 1948, SA)
Anselm Berrigan (born 1972, US)
Daniel Berrigan (1921–2016, US)
Ted Berrigan (1934–1983, US)
James Berry (1924–2017, J/E)
Wendell Berry (born 1934, US)
John Berryman (1914–1972, US)
Charles Best (1570–1627, E)
Mary Matilda Betham (1776–1852, E)
Matilda Betham-Edwards (1836–1919, E)
Ursula Bethell (1874–1945, NZ)
John Betjeman (1906–1984, E)
Craven Langstroth Betts (1853–1941, C)
Elizabeth Beverley (fl. 1815–1830, E)
Judith Beveridge (born 1956, A)
Helen Bevington (1906–2001, US)
L. S. Bevington (1845–1895, E)
Thomas Bibby (1799–1863, Ir)
Ruth Bidgood (born 1922, W)
Lettie S. Bigelow (1849-1906, US)
Vonani Bila (born 1972, SA)
Robert Billings (1949–1986, C)
William Billington (1825–1884, E)
Margaret Bingham (1740–1814, E)
Laurence Binyon (1869–1943, E)
Hera Lindsay Bird (born 1987, NZ)
Earle Birney (1904–1995, C)
Dora Birtles (1903–1992, A)
Elizabeth Bishop (1911–1979, US)
Morris Bishop (1893–1973, US)
Samuel Bishop (1731–1795, E)
Bill Bissett (born 1939, C)
Sherwin Bitsui (born 1974, US)
David MacLeod Black (born 1941, S)
Sophie Cabot Black (born 1958, US)
Paul Blackburn (1926–1971, US)
Thomas Blacklock (1721–1791, S)
Leigh Blackmore (born 1959, A)
R. P. Blackmur (1904–1965, US)
Peter Bladen (1922–2001, A)
Isa Blagden (1816 or 1817–1873, It)
Max Blagg (born 1948, E/US)
Mark Blagrave (born 1956, C)
Robert Blair (1699–1746, S)
Lewis Blake (born 1946, E)
William Blake (1757–1827, E)
Susanna Blamire (1747–1794, E)
Paddy Blanchfield (1911–1980, NZ)
Richard Blanco (born 1968, US)
Don Blanding (1894–1957, US)
Robin Blaser (1925–2009, C)
Ann Eliza Bleecker (1752–1783, US)
Adrian Blevins (born 1964, US)
John Blight (1913–1995, A)
Mathilde Blind (1841–1896, E)
Laurie Block (1949–2018, C)
E. D. Blodgett (1935–2018, C)
Benjamin Paul Blood (1832–1919, US)
Valerie Bloom (born 1956, J/E)
Robert Bloomfield (1766–1823, E)
Elizabeth Blower (c. 1757/63 – post-1816, E)
Edmund Blunden (1896–1974, E)
Roy Blumenthal (born 1968, SA)
Wilfrid Scawen Blunt (1840–1922, E)
Robert Bly (born 1926, US)
Ali Blythe (living, C)
Barcroft Boake (1866–1892, A)
Robert Boates (born 1954, C)
Merlinda Bobis (born 1959, A)
Louise Bogan (1897–1970, US)
Michelle Boisseau (1955–2017, US)
Christian Bök (born 1966, C)
Osbern Bokenam (c. 1393 – c. 1464, E)
George Henry Boker (1823–1890, US)
Eavan Boland (1944–2020, Ir)
Alan Bold (1943–1998, S)
Dermot Bolger (born 1959, Ir)
Stephanie Bolster (born 1969, C)
Edmund Bolton (c. 1575 – c. 1633)
Ken Bolton (born 1949, A)
Roger Bonair-Agard (living, J/US)
Horatius Bonar (1808–1889, S)
Elizabeth Bonhôte (1744–1818, E)
Sean Bonney (1969–2019, E)
Arna Wendell Bontemps (1902–1973, US)
Shane Book (living, C)
Luke Booker (1762–1835, E)
Kurt Boone (born 1959, US)
Henry Ernest Boote (1865–1949, A)
Ivan Bootham (1939–2016, NZ)
Pat Boran (born 1963, Ir)
Jenny Bornholdt (born 1960, NZ)
Roo Borson (born 1952, C)
Keith Bosley (1937–2018, E)
Anne Lynch Botta (1815–1891, US)
Gordon Bottomley (1874–1948, E)
David Bottoms (born 1949, US)
Jenny Boult (MML Bliss, 1951–2005, A)
Francis William Bourdillon (1852–1921, E)
Arthur Bourinot (1893–1969, C)
John Philip Bourke (1860–1914, A)
Jane Bowdler (1743–1784, E)
George Bowering (born 1936, C)
Marilyn Bowering (born 1949, C)
Cathy Smith Bowers (born 1949, US)
Edgar Bowers (1924–2000, US)
Tim Bowling (born 1964, C)
Alex Boyd (born 1969, C)
Louise Esther Vickroy Boyd (1827–1909, US)
Mark Alexander Boyd (1563–1601, S)
Kay Boyle (1902–1992, US)
Peter Boyle (born 1951, A)
Samuel Boyse (1702/1703–1749, Ir/E)
Virginia Frazer Boyle (1863-1938, US)

Br–By
Francis Brabazon (1907–1984, A)
Thomas Bracken (1843–1898, NZ)
Alison Brackenbury (born 1953, E)
Anna Braden (1858-1939, US)
James Bradley (born 1967, A)
Anne Bradstreet (c. 1612–1672, US)
Robert Bradstreet (1766–1836, E)
E. J. Brady (1869–1952, A)
Kate Braid (born 1947, C)
Lawrence Ytzhak Braithwaite (1963–2008, C)
Shannon Bramer (born 1973, C)
Bertha Southey Brammall (1878–1957, A)
James Bramston (c. 1694–1743, E)
Dionne Brand (born 1953, C)
Di Brandt (born 1952, C)
Charles Brasch (1909–1973, NZ)
Giannina Braschi (born 1953, US)
Kamau Brathwaite (1930–2020, B)
Richard Brautigan (1935–1984, US)
John Jefferson Bray (1912–1995, A)
Diana Brebner (1956–2001, C)
Jean "Binta" Breeze (1956–2021, J)
Christopher Brennan (1870–1932, A)
Breyten Breytenbach (born 1939, SA/F)
Joseph Payne Brennan (1918–1990, US)
Michael Brennan (born 1973, A)
Jane Brereton (1685–1740, W)
John Le Gay Brereton (1871–1933, A)
Nicholas Breton (1542–1626, E)
Brian Brett (born 1950, C)
Lily Brett (born 1946, A)
Ken Brewer (1941–2006, US)
Elizabeth Brewster (1922–2012, C)
Martha Wadsworth Brewster (1710 – c. 1757, US)
Breyten Breytenbach (born 1939, SA)
Diana Bridge (born 1942, NZ)
Robert Bridges (1844–1930, E)
Kim Bridgford (1959–2000, US)
Robert Bringhurst (born 1946, C)
Geoffrey Brock (born 1964, US)
Eve Brodlique (1867-1949, UK/C/US)
Alexander Brome (1620–1666, E)
David Bromige (1933–2009, C/US)
William Bronk (1918–1999, US)
Anne Brontë (1820–1849, E)
Branwell Brontë (1817–1848, E)
Charlotte Brontë (1816–1855, E)
Emily Brontë (1818–1848, E)
Rupert Brooke (1887–1915, E)
David Brooks (born 1953, A)
Gwendolyn Brooks (1917–2000, US)
Alice Williams Brotherton (1848-1930, US)
Audrey Alexandra Brown (1904–1998, C)
George Mackay Brown (1921–1996, S)
James Brown (J. B. Selkirk, 1832–1904, S)
Jericho Brown (born 1976, US)
Pam Brown (born 1948, A)
Sterling Allen Brown (1901–1989, US)
Stewart Brown (born 1951, E)
Thomas Edward Brown (1830–1897, IoM)
Wayne Brown (1944–2009, T)
Frances Browne (1816–1879, Ir)
Isaac Hawkins Browne (1705–1760, E)
Moses Browne (1704–1787, E)
Sir Thomas Browne (1605–1682, E)
William Browne (1588–1643, E)
Elizabeth Barrett Browning (1806–1861, E/It)
Robert Browning (1812–1889, E/It)
Charles Tory Bruce (1906–1971, C)
Mary Grant Bruce (1878–1958, A)
Julie Bruck (living, C)
Dennis Brutus (1924–2009, SA)
William Cullen Bryant (1794–1878, US)
Colette Bryce (born 1970, NI/E)
Bryher (Annie Winifred Ellerman, 1894–1983, E)
Dugald Buchanan (1716–1768, S)
George Buchanan (1506–1582, S)
Robert Williams Buchanan (1841–1901, S)
Vincent Buckley (1925–1988, A)
Charles Buckmaster (1950–1972, A)
David Budbill (1940–2016, US)
Robert Budde (born 1966, C)
Andrea Hollander Budy (born 1947, US)
Suzanne Buffam (living, C)
Charles Bukowski (1920–1994, US)
April Bulmer (born 1963, C)
Rhoda Bulter (1929–1994, S)
Basil Bunting (1900–1985, E)
Anthony Burgess (1917–1993, E)
Haldane Burgess (1862–1927, S)
Andrew Burke (born 1944, A)
Murdoch Burnett (1953–2015, C)
Joanne Burns (born 1945, A)
Robert Burns (1759–1796, S)
Stanley Burnshaw (1906–2005, US)
John Burnside (born 1955, S)
Sophia Burrell (1753–1802, E)
William S. Burroughs (1914–1997, US)
Mick Burrs (1940–2021, C)
Duncan Bush (1946–2017, W/E)
Olivia Ward Bush-Banks (1869–1944, US)
Aaron Bushkowsky (born 1957, C)
Guy Butler (1918–2001, SA)
Samuel Butler (1612–1680, E)
Ray Buttigieg (born 1955, M)
Anthony Butts (born 1969, US)
A. S. Byatt (born 1936, E)
Kathryn Stripling Byer (1944–2017, US)
Witter Bynner (Emanuel Morgan, 1881–1968, US)
Lord Byron (1788–1824, E/It)

C

Ca–Ci
Richard Caddel (1949–2003, E)
Caroline Caddy (born 1944, A)
Charmaine Cadeau (living, C)
Adrian Caesar (born 1955, A)
Stephen Cain (born 1970, C)
Scott Cairns (born 1954, US)
Alison Calder (living, C)
Angus Calder (1942–2008, S)
Alex Caldiero (born 1949, US)
Frank Oliver Call (1878–1956, C)
Barry Callaghan (born 1937, C)
Michael Feeney Callan (living, Ir)
Charles Stuart Calverley (1831–1884, E)
Robert Calvert (1945–1988, E)
Anne Cameron (Cam Hubert, born 1938, C)
Norman Cameron (1905–1953, S)
Jason Camlot (born 1967, C)
A. Y. Campbell (1885–1958, S)
Alistair Campbell (1925–2009, NZ)
Angus Peter Campbell (living, S)
David Campbell (1915–1979, A)
Elizabeth Campbell (born 1980, A)
Joseph Campbell (1879–1944, Ir)
Meg Campbell (1937–2007, NZ)
Paul-Henri Campbell (born 1982, US)
Roy Campbell (1901–1957, SA)
Thomas Campbell (1774–1844, S/E)
William Wilfred Campbell (1860–1918, C)
Thomas Campion (1567–1620, E)
Melville Henry Cane (1879–1980, US)
Mary Wedderburn Cannan (1893–1973, E)
Moya Cannon (living, Ir)
Edward Capern (1819–1894, E)
Vahni Capildeo (born 1973, T/S)
Natalee Caple (born 1970, C)
Thomas Carew (1595–1639, E)
Henry Carey (1693–1743, E)
Robert Carliell (died c. 1622, E)
Bliss Carman (1861–1929, C/US)
Clyde Carr (1886–1962, NZ)
Fern G. Z. Carr (born 1956, C)
Jim Carroll (1949–2009, US)
Lewis Carroll (1832–1898, E)
Hayden Carruth (1921–2008, US)
A.J. Carruthers (living, A)
Ann Elizabeth Carson (born 1929, C)
Anne Carson (born 1950, C)
Ciaran Carson (1948–2019, NI)
Elizabeth Carter (1717–1806, E)
Jared Carter (born 1939, US)
William Cartwright (1611–1643, E)
Raymond Carver (1938–1988, US)
Alice Cary (1820–1871, US)
Phoebe Cary (1824–1871, US)
Marietta Stanley Case (1845-1900, US)
James Casey (1824–1909, Ir)
Juanita Casey (1925–2012, E)
Neal Cassady (1926–1968, US)
Cyrus Cassells (born 1957, US)
Ana Castillo (born 1953, US)
Lee Cataldi (born 1942, A)
Nancy Cato (1917–2000, A)
Charles Causley (1917–2003, E)
Nick Cave (born 1957, A)
George Cavendish (1494 – c. 1562, E)
Margaret Cavendish, Duchess of Newcastle-upon-Tyne (1623–1673, E)
Kate Cayley (living, C)
Susanna Centlivre (c. 1667/1670 – 1723, E)
Thomas Centolella (living, US)
Joseph Ceravolo (1934–1988, US)
John Chalkhill (fl. 1600, E)
Gordon Challis (1932–2018, NZ)
Weyman Chan (born 1963, C)
Catherine Chandler (born 1950, C)
Elizabeth Margaret Chandler (1807–1834, US)
Diana Chang (1924–2009, US)
William Ellery Channing (1818–1901, US)
Arthur Chapman (1873–1935, US)
George Chapman (1560–1634, E)
Patrick Chapman (born 1968, Ir)
Fred Chappell (born 1936, US)
Craig Charles (born 1964, E)
James Charlton (born 1947, A)
Thomas Chatterton (1752–1770, E)
Geoffrey Chaucer (c. 1343–1400, E)
Angelico Chavez (1910–1996, US)
Syl Cheney-Coker (born 1945, SLe)
Maxine Chernoff (born 1952, US)
Kelly Cherry (born 1940, US)
G. K. Chesterton (1874–1936, E)
Thomas Chestre (late 14th c., E)
James Wm. Chichetto (born 1941, US)
Lydia Maria Child (1802–1880, US)
Harriet L. Childe-Pemberton (1852 – 1922, E)
Billy Childish (born 1959, E)
Marilyn Chin (born 1955, US)
Staceyann Chin (born 1972, J)
Eileen Chong (born 1980, A)
Robert Choquette (1905–1991, C)
Lesley Choyce (born 1951, C)
Margaret Christakos (born 1962, C)
Evie Christie (living, C)
Ralph Chubb (1892–1960, E)
Mary Chudleigh (1656–1710, E)
Hubert Newman Wigmore Church (1857–1932, A)
Richard Church (1893–1972, E)
Charles Churchill (1731–1764, E)
John Ciardi (1916–1986, US)
Colley Cibber (1671–1757, E)
Charl Cilliers (born 1941, SA)
Sandra Cisneros (born 1954, US)
Carson Cistulli (born 1979, US)

Cl
Amy Clampitt (1920–1994, US
Kate Clanchy (born 1965, S)
John Clanvowe (c. 1341–1391, W/E)
John Clare (1793–1864, E)
Dave Clark (living, C)
Douglas Clark (1942–2010, E)
Elizabeth Clark (1918–1978, S)
Emily Clark (fl. 1798–1833, E)
Ross Clark (born 1953, A)
Tom Clark (1941–2018, US)
Thomas Clark (born 1980, S)
Amy Key Clarke (1892–1980, E)
Austin Clarke (1886–1974, Ir)
George Elliott Clarke (born 1960, C)
Gillian Clarke (born 1937, W)
Jack Clarke (1933–1992, US)
Marcus Clarke (1846–1881, A)
Brian P. Cleary (born 1959, US)
Brendan Cleary (born 1958, NI)
William Cleland (1661–1689, S)
Justin Clemens (born 1969, A)
Benjamin Clementine (born 1988, E/F)
Jack Clemo (1916–1994, E)
John Cleveland (1613–1658, E)
Michelle Cliff (1946–2016, J/US)
Wayne Clifford (born 1944, C)
Lucille Clifton (1936–2010, US)
Caroline Clive (1801–1873, E)
Arthur Hugh Clough (1819–1861, E)

Co–Cu
Grace Stone Coates (1881–1976, US)
Florence Earle Coates (1850–1927, US)
Bob Cobbing (1920–2002, E)
Robbie Coburn (born 1994, A)
Alison Cockburn (awa Alison Rutherford, 1712–1794, S)
Alice Rollit Coe (1858–1940, US)
Judith Ortiz Cofer (1952–2016, US)
Brian Coffey (1905–1995, Ir/F)
Fred Cogswell (1917–2004, C)
Leonard Cohen (1934–2016, C)
Matt Cohen (1942–1999, C)
Allison Hedge Coke (born 1958, US)
Norma Cole (born 1945, C/US)
Hal Gibson Pateshall Colebatch (1945–2019, A)
Aidan Coleman (born 1976, A)
Victor Coleman (born 1944, C)
Wanda Coleman (1946–2013, US)
Hartley Coleridge (1796–1849, E)
Mary Elizabeth Coleridge (1861–1907, E)
Samuel Taylor Coleridge (1772–1834, E)
Don Coles (1927–2017, C)
Katharine Coles (born 1959, US)
Edward Coletti (living, US)
Mary Collier (c. 1688–1762, E)
Billy Collins (born 1941, US)
John Collins (1742–1808, E)
William Collins (1721–1759, E)
Laurence Collinson (1925–1986, A)
Stephen Collis (living, C)
John Robert Colombo (born 1936, C)
Glenn Colquhoun (born 1964, NZ)
Padraic Colum (1881–1972, Ir/US)
Anna Olcott Commelin (1841–1924, US)
Anne Compton (born 1947, C)
Wayde Compton (born 1972, C)
Helen Gray Cone (1859–1934, US)
William Congreve (1670–1729, E)
Jan Conn (born 1952, C/US)
Stewart Conn (born 1936, S)
Paul Conneally (born 1959, E)
Karen Connelly (born 1969, C)
Kevin Connolly (born 1962, C)
Susan Connolly (born 1956, Ir)
Robert Conquest (1917–2015, E)
Tony Conran (1931–2013, W)
Henry Constable (1562–1613, E/F)
David Constantine (born 1944, E)
Eliza Cook (1818–1889, E)
Elizabeth Cook-Lynn (born 1930, US)
Sophie Cooke (born 1976, S)
Ina Coolbrith (1841–1928, US)
Dennis Cooley (born 1944, C)
Clark Coolidge (born 1939, US)
Afua Cooper (born 1957, J/C)
Thomas Cooper (1805–1892, E)
Jack Cope (1913–1991, SA)
Wendy Cope (born 1945, E)
Judith Copithorne (born 1939, C)
Robert Copland (fl. 1508–1547, E)
A. E. Coppard (1878–1957, E)
Julia Copus (born 1969, E)
Richard Corbet (1582–1635, E)
Cid Corman (1924–2004, US)
Alfred Corn (born 1943, US)
Adam Cornford (born 1950, E)
Frances Cornford (1886–1960, E)
Francis M. Cornford (1874–1943, E)
John Cornford (1915–1936, E)
Joe Corrie (1894–1968, S)
Gregory Corso (1930–2001, US)
Jayne Cortez (1936–2012, US)
William Johnson Cory (1823–1892, E)
Louisa Stuart Costello (1799–1877, Ir/F)
Charles Cotton (1630–1687, E)
Anna Couani (born 1948, A)
Anne Ross Cousin (1824–1906, E/S)
Dani Couture (born 1978, C)
Thomas Cowherd (1817–1907, C)
Abraham Cowley (1618–1667, E)
Hannah Cowley (1743–1809, E)
Malcolm Cowley (1898–1989, US)
Dorothy Cowlin (1911–2010, E)
William Cowper (1731–1800, E)
George Crabbe (1754–1832, E)
Christine Craig (born 1943, J)
Helen Craik (c. 1751–1825, S/E)
Hart Crane (1899–1932, US)
Stephen Crane (1871–1900, US)
Richard Crashaw (1613–1649, E)
Isabella Valancy Crawford (1846–1887, C)
Robert Crawford (1868–1930, A)
Robert Crawford (born 1959, S)
Richard Crawley (1840–1893, W/E)
Morri Creech (born 1970, US)
Robert Creeley (1926–2006, US)
Caroline de Crespigny (1797–1861, E/G)
Walter D'Arcy Cresswell (1896–1960, NZ)
Louise Crisp (born 1957, A)
Ann Batten Cristall (1769–1848, E)
Andy Croft (born 1956, E)
Julian Croft (born 1941, A)
Alison Croggon (born 1962, A)
Jeremy Cronin (born 1949, SA)
M. T. C. Cronin (born 1963, A)
Lynn Crosbie (born 1963, C)
Camilla Dufour Crosland (1812–1895, E)
Zora Cross (1890–1964, A)
Aleister Crowley (1875–1947, E)
Andrew Crozier (1943–2008, E)
Lorna Crozier (Lorna Uher, born 1948, C)
Helen Cruickshank (1886–1975, S)
Michael Crummey (born 1965, C)
Julie Crysler (living, C)
Anne Virginia Culbertson (1857-1918, US)
Catherine Ann Cullen (living, Ir)
Countee Cullen (1903–1946, US)
Nancy Jo Cullen (living, C)
Patrick Cullinan (1932–2011, SA)
E. E. Cummings (1894–1962, US)
Gary Cummiskey (born 1963, SA)
Allan Cunningham (1784–1842, S/E)
J. V. Cunningham (1911–1985, US)
John Cunningham (1729–1773, Ir/E)
Allen Curnow (1911–2001, NZ)
Margaret Curran (1887–1962, A)
Jen Currin (living, US/C)
Tony Curtis (born 1946, W)
Tony Curtis (born 1955, Ir)
James Cuthbertson (1851–1910, A)
Ivor Cutler (1923–2006, S)
Lidija Cvetkovic (born 1967, A)
Kayla Czaga (born 1989, C)

D

Da–Do
H.D. (Hilda Doolittle, 1886–1961, US)
Cyril Dabydeen (living, Gu/C)
David Dabydeen (born 1955, Gu)
Kalli Dakos (living, C)
Victor Daley (1858–1905, A)
Mary Dalton (born 1950, C)
Pádraig J. Daly (born 1943, Ir)
Raymond Garfield Dandridge (1882/1883–1930, US)
Joseph A. Dandurand (living, C)
Achmat Dangor (born 1948, SA)
Samuel Daniel (1562–1619, E)
David Daniels (1933–2008, US)
Jeffrey Daniels (living, US)
George Darley (1795–1846, Ir)
Tina Darragh (born 1950, US)
Keki N. Daruwalla (born 1937, In)
Erasmus Darwin (1731–1802, E)
Elizabeth Daryush (1887–1977, E)
Robert von Dassanowsky (Robert Dassanowsky) (born 1965, US)
Beverley Daurio (born 1953, C)
William Davenant (1606–1668, E)
Guy Davenport (1927–2005, US)
Frank Davey (born 1940, C)
Donald Davidson (1893–1968, US)
John Davidson (1857–1909, S/E)
Lucretia Maria Davidson (1808–1825, US)
Michael Davidson (born 1944, US)
Donald Davie (1922–1995, E)
Alan Davies (born 1951, US)
Deborah Kay Davies (living, W)
Hugh Sykes Davies (1909–1984, E)
Idris Davies (1905–1953, W)
John Davies (1569–1626, E)
W. H. Davies (1871–1940, W)
Nicholas Flood Davin (1840–1901, C)
Olive Dehn (1914–2007, E)
Beatrice Deloitte Davis (1909–1992, A)
Jon Davis (living, US)
Norma Davis (1905–1945, A)
Tanya Davis (living, C)
Thomas Osborne Davis (1814–1845, Ir)
Edward Davison (1898–1970, S/US)
Peter Davison (1928–2004, US)
Bruce Dawe (1930–2020, A)
Kwame Dawes (born 1962, US)
Tom Dawe (born 1940, C)
Jeffery Day (1896–1918, E)
Sarah Day (born 1958, A)
Cecil Day-Lewis (1904–1972, E)
Adriana de Barros (born 1976, C)
Somerset de Chair (1911–1995, E)
Jean Louis De Esque (1879–1956, US)
Madeline DeFrees (1919–2015, US)
Celia de Fréine (born 1948, Ir)
Ingrid de Kok (born 1951, SA)
Walter de la Mare (1873–1956, E)
Christine De Luca (born 1947, S)
Sadiqa de Meijer (born 1977, C)
Edward de Vere, 17th Earl of Oxford (1550–1604, E)
Phillippa Yaa de Villiers (born 1966, SA)
James Deahl (born 1945, C)
Dulcie Deamer (1890–1972, A)
John F. Deane (born 1943, Ir)
Joel Deane (born 1969, A)
Patrick Deeley (born 1953, Ir)
Madeline DeFrees (1919–2015, US)
Thomas Dekker (1575–1641, E)
Greg Delanty (born 1958, Ir/US)
Kris Demeanor (living, C)
Barry Dempster (born 1952, C)
Joe Denham (living, C)
John Denham (1615–1669, E)
C. J. Dennis (1876–1938, A)
John Dennison (born 1978, NZ)
Tory Dent (1958–2005, US)
Enid Derham (1882–1941, A)
Thomas Dermody (1775–1802, Ir)
Toi Derricotte (born 1941, US)
Heather Derr-Smith (born 1971, US)
Michelle Desbarats (living, C)
Babette Deutsch (1895–1982, US)
James Devaney (1890–1976, A)
Mary Deverell (1731–1805, E)
Denis Devlin (1908–1959, Ir)
George E. Dewar (1895–1969, NZ)
Christopher Dewdney (born 1951, C]
Imtiaz Dharker (born 1954, P/W)
Pier Giorgio Di Cicco (1949–2019, C)
Mary di Michele (born 1949, C)
Diane di Prima (1934–2020, US)
Ann Diamond (living, C)
Natalie Diaz (born 1978, US)
Anne Dick (died 1741, S)
Jennifer K Dick (born 1970, US)
James Dickey (1923–1997, US)
Adam Dickinson (living, C)
Emily Dickinson (1830–1886, US)
Matthew Dickman (born 1975, US)
Michael Dickman (born 1975, US)
Robert Dickson (1944–2007, C)
Peter Didsbury (born 1946, E)
Modikwe Dikobe (1913–?, SA)
Des Dillon (living, S)
John Dillon (1851–1927, Ir)
B. R. Dionysius (born 1969, A)
Ray DiPalma (1943–2016, US)
Thomas M. Disch (born 1940, US)
Chitra Banerjee Divakaruni (born 1956, In/US)
Isobel Dixon (born 1969, SA/E)
Sarah Dixon (1671–1765, E)
William Hepworth Dixon (1821–1879, E)
Angifi Dladla (born 1950, SA)
Tim Dlugos (1950–1990, US)
Kildare Dobbs (1923–2013, C)
Henry Austin Dobson (1840–1921, E)
Rosemary Dobson (1920–2012, A)
Stephen Dobyns (born 1941, US)
Jeramy Dodds (born 1974, C)
Robert Dodsley (1703–1764, E)
Pete Doherty (born 1979, E)
Digby Mackworth Dolben (1848–1867, E)
Joe Dolce (born 1947, US/A)
Don Domanski (born 1950, C)
Magie Dominic (born 1944, C)
Jeffery Donaldson (living, C)
John Donaldson (Jon Inglis, 1921–1989, E)
John Donne (1572–1631, E)
David Donnell (born 1939, C)
Timothy Donnelly (born 1969, US)
Gerard Donovan (born 1959, Ir/E)
Theo Dorgan (born 1953, Ir)
Ed Dorn (1929–1999, US)
Catherine Ann Dorset (1752–1834, E)
Candas Jane Dorsey (born 1952, C)
Mark Doty (born 1953, US)
Clive Doucet (born 1946, C)
Sarah Doudney (1841–1926, E)
Lucy Dougan (born 1966, A)
Charles Montagu Doughty (1843–1926, E)
Lord Alfred Douglas (1870–1945, E)
Alice May Douglas (1865–1943, US)
Gavin Douglas (c. 1474–1522, S)
George Brisbane Scott Douglas (1856–1935, S)
Keith Douglas (1920–1944, E)
Orville Lloyd Douglas (born 1976, C)
Rita Dove (born 1952, US)
Basil Dowling (1910–2000, NZ)
Finuala Dowling (born 1962, SA)
Gordon Downie (1964–2017, C)
Ellen Mary Patrick Downing (1828–1869, Ir)
Ernest Dowson (1867–1900, E)
Francis Hastings Doyle (1810–1888, E)
Kirby Doyle (1932–2003, US)

Dr–Dy
Michael Dransfield (1948–1973, A)
Jane Draycott (born 1954, E)
Michael Drayton (1563–1631, E)
John Swanwick Drennan (1809–1893, Ir)
William Drennan (1754–1820, Ir)
Adam Drinan (also Joseph Macleod, 1903–1984, E)
John Drinkwater (1882–1937, E)
William Drummond of Hawthornden (1585–1649, S)
William Henry Drummond (1854–1907, C)
John Dryden (1631–1700, E)
W. E. B. Du Bois (1868–1963, US)
I. D. du Plessis (1900–1981, SA)
Klara du Plessis (living, SA/C)
Norman Dubie (born 1945, US)
Stephen Duck (c. 1705–1756, E)
Louis Dudek (1918–2001, S)
Carol Ann Duffy (born 1955, S)
Charles Gavan Duffy (1816–1903, Ir/A)
Maureen Duffy (born 1933, E)
Alan Dugan (1923–2003, J/US)
Michael Dugan (1947–2006, A)
Sasha Dugdale (born 1974, E)
Eileen Duggan (1894–1972, NZ)
Laurie Duggan (born 1949, A)
Jas H. Duke (1939–1992, A)
Richard Duke (1658–1711, E)
Tug Dumbly (Geoff Forrester, living, A)
Marilyn Dumont (born 1955, C)
Paul Laurence Dunbar (1872–1906, US)
Robert Nugent Dunbar (1798-1866, Ag)
William Dunbar (1459 or 1460 – c. 1530, S)
Andrew Duncan (born 1956, E)
Robert Duncan (1919–1988, US)
Camille Dungy (born 1972, US)
Helen Dunmore (1952–2017, E)
Douglas Dunn (born 1942, S)
Max Dunn (died 1963, A)
Stephen Dunn (1939–2021, US)
Joe Dunthorne (born 1982, W)
Paul Durcan (born 1944, Ir)
Lawrence Durrell (1912–1990, E)
Anne Dutton (1692–1765, E)
Geoffrey Dutton (1922–1998, A)
Stuart Dybek (born 1942, US)
Edward Dyer (1543–1607, E)
John Dyer (1699–1758, W)
Bob Dylan (born 1941, US)
Edward Dyson (1865–1931, A)

E

Joan Adeney Easdale (1913–1998, E)
Evelyn Eaton (1902–1983, C)
Richard Eberhart (1904–2005, US)
Emily Eden (1797–1869, E)
Helen Parry Eden (1885–1960, E)
Stephen Edgar (born 1951, A)
Lauris Edmond (1924–2000, NZ)
Russell Edson (1928–2014, US)
Richard Edwardes (c. 1523–1566, E)
Dic Edwards (born 1953, W)
Jonathan Edwards (born 1979, W)
Rhian Edwards (living, W/E)
Helen Merrill Egerton (1866-1951, C)
Terry Ehret (born 1955, US)
Vic Elias (1948–2006, US/C)
Anne Elder (1918–1976, A)
George Eliot (Mary Anne Evans, 1819–1880, E)
T. S. Eliot (1888–1965, US/E)
Elizabeth F. Ellet (1818–1877, US)
Charlotte Elliot (1839–1880, S)
David Elliott (1923–1999, C)
Jean Elliot (1727–1805, S)
Ebenezer Elliott (1781–1849, E)
George Ellis (1753–1815, E)
Royston Ellis (born 1941, E)
Chris Else (born 1942, NZ)
Rebecca Elson (1960–1999, C)
Crispin Elsted (living, C)
Edmund Elviden (fl. 1570, E)
Claudia Emerson (1957–2014, US)
Ralph Waldo Emerson (1803–1882, US)
Chris Emery (born 1963, E)
William Empson (1906–1984, E)
Paul Engle (1908–1991, US)
John Ennis (born 1944, Ir)
Karen Enns (living, C)
D. J. Enright (1920–2002, E)
Riemke Ensing (born 1939, NZ)
Theodore Enslin (1925–2011, US)
Louise Erdrich (born 1954, US)
Ralph Erskine (1685–1752, S)
Clayton Eshleman (1935–2021, US)
Martín Espada (born 1957, US)
Ramabai Espinet (born 1948, T)
Jill Alexander Essbaum (born 1971, US)
Maggie Estep (1963–2014, US)
George Etherege (1635–1691, E)
Michael Estok (1939–1989, C)
Jerry Estrin (1947–1993, US)
Anne Evans (1820–1870, E)
Christine Evans (born 1943, E/W)
George Essex Evans (1863–1909, A)
Margiad Evans (Peggy Whistler, 1909–1958, E)
Mari Evans (1919–2017, US)
Sebastian Evans (1830–1909, E)
William Everson (Brother Antoninus, 1912–1994, US)
Gavin Ewart (1916–1995, E)
John K. Ewers (1904–1978, A)
Elisabeth Eybers (1915–2007, SA/Nt)

F

Frederick William Faber (1814–1863, E)
Diane Fahey (born 1945, A)
Ruth Fainlight (born 1931, US/E)
Kingsley Fairbridge (1885–1924, SA)
A. R. D. Fairburn (1904–1957, NZ)
Maria and Harriet Falconar (born c. 1771–1774, E or S)
William Falconer (1732–1769, S)
Padraic Fallon (1905–1974, Ir)
Catherine Maria Fanshawe (1765–1834, E)
U. A. Fanthorpe (1929–1909, E)
Patricia Fargnoli (born 1937, US)
Eleanor Farjeon (1881–1965, E)
Fiona Farrell (born 1947, NZ)
John Farrell (1851–1904, A)
John Farrell (1968–2010, US)
Michael Farrell (born 1965, A)
Katie Farris (born 1983, US)
Margaretta Faugères (1771–1801, US)
Jessie Redmon Fauset (1882–1961, US)
Brian Fawcett (1944–2022, C)
Elaine Feeney (living, Ir)
Elaine Feinstein (1930–2019, E)
Alison Fell (born 1944, S)
Charles Fenerty (c. 1821–1892, C)
Elijah Fenton (1683–1730, E)
James Fenton (born 1931, NI)
James Fenton (born 1949, E)
Richard Fenton (1747–1821, W)
Gus Ferguson (1940–2020, SA)
Samuel Ferguson (1810–1886, Ir)
Robert Fergusson (1750–1774, S)
Lawrence Ferlinghetti (1919–2021, US)
Ferron (Deborah Foisy, born 1952, C)
George Fetherling (born 1949, C)
Michael Field (Katherine Bradley, 1846–1914, and Edith Cooper, 1862–1913, E)
Henry Fielding (1707–1754, E)
Connie Fife (1961–2017, C)
Anne Finch, Countess of Winchilsea (1661–1720, E)
Annie Finch (born 1956, US)
Peter Finch (living, W)
Robert Finch (1900–1995, C)
Ian Hamilton Finlay (1925–2006, S)
Joan Finnigan (1925–2007, C)
Jon Paul Fiorentino (living, C)
Catherine Fisher (born 1957, W)
Roy Fisher (1930–2017, E)
Edward FitzGerald (1809–1883, E)
Judith Fitzgerald (1952–2015, C)
R. D. Fitzgerald (1902–1987, A)
Robert Fitzgerald (1910–1985, US)
Richard FitzPatrick (1748–1813, Ir/E)
Roderick Flanagan (1828–1862, A)
James Elroy Flecker (1884–1915, E)
Marjorie Fleming (1803–1811, S)
Giles Fletcher (c. 1586–1623, E)
Giles Fletcher, the Elder (c. 1548–1611, E)
John Fletcher (1579–1625, E)
John Gould Fletcher (1886–1950, US)
Lisa Anne Fletcher (1844-1905, US)
Phineas Fletcher (1582–1650, E)
Robert Fletcher (fl. 1586, E)
Maria De Fleury (c. 1754 – c. 1794, E)
F. S. Flint (1885–1960, E)
Alice Flowerdew (1759–1830, E)
Lionel Fogarty (born 1958, A)
Jack Foley (born 1940, US)
Mary Hannay Foott (1846–1918, A)
John Forbes (1950–1998, A)
Carolyn Forché (born 1950, US)
Ford Madox Ford (1873–1939, E)
John Ford (1586–1639, E)
John M. Ford (1957–2006, US)
Robert Ford (1915–1998, C)
Mabel Forrest (1872–1935, A)
William Forrest (fl. 1581, E)
Veronica Forrest-Thomson (1947–1975, S)
Gary Jeshel Forrester (born 1946, NZ)
William Forster (1818–1882, A)
John Foulcher (born 1952, A)
Ellen Thorneycroft Fowler (1860–1920, E)
William Fowler (c. 1560–1612, S)
Kate Fox (born 1975, E)
Len Fox (1905–2004, A)
Janet Frame (1924–2004, NZ)
Ruth France (1913–1968, NZ)
Matthew Francis (born 1956, E/W)
Robert Francis (1901–1987, US)
George Sutherland Fraser (1915–1980, S)
Gregory Fraser (living, US)
Raymond Fraser (1941–2018, C)
Benjamin Frater (1979–2007, A)
Brentley Frazer (born 1972, A)
Grace Beacham Freeman (1916–2002, US)
John Freeman (1880–1929, E)
Nicholas Freeston (1907–1978, E)
Patrick Friesen (born 1946, C)
Anthony Freston (1757–1819, E) 
Robert Frost (1874–1963, US)
Gwen Frostic (1906–2001, US)
Gene Frumkin (1928–2007, US)
Mark Frutkin (born 1948, US/C)
Sheila Meiring Fugard (born 1932, SA)
Ethel Romig Fuller (1883–1965, US)
John Fuller (born 1937, E)
Roy Fuller (1912–1991, E)
Mary Eliza Fullerton (1868–1946, A)
Alice Fulton (born 1952, US)
Graham Fulton (born 1959, S)
Robin Fulton (born 1937, S)
Ulpian Fulwell (1545/1546 – before 1586, E)
Richard Furness (1791–1857, E)

G

Ga–Go
Frances Dana Barker Gage (1808–1884, US)
Georgie Starbuck Galbraith (1909–1980, US)
Dunstan Gale (fl. 1596, E)
Kate Gale (living, US)
James Galvin (born 1951, US)
Patrick Galvin (1927–2011, Ir)
Forrest Gander (born 1956, US)
Robert Garioch (1909–1981, S)
Hamlin Garland (1860–1940, US)
Raymond Garlick (1926–2011, W)
Richard Garnett (1835–1906, E)
Jean Garrigue (1912–1972, US)
Samuel Garth (1661–1719, E)
George Gascoigne (1525–1577, E)
David Gascoyne (1916–2001, E/F)
Bill Gaston (born 1953, C)
John Gay (1685–1732, E)
Ross Gay (born 1974, US)
William Gay (1865–1897, S/A)
Alexander Geddes (1737–1802, S)
Leon Gellert (1892–1977, A)
W. R. P. George (1912–2006, W)
Dan Gerber (born 1940, US)
Amy Gerstler (born 1956, US)
Marty Gervais (living, C)
Charles Ghigna (born 1946, US)
Monk Gibbon (1896–1987, Ir)
Reginald Gibbons (born 1947, US)
Stella Gibbons (1902–1989, E)
Ivy Gibbs (c. 1886–1966, NZ)
Kahlil Gibran (1883–1931, L/US)
G. H. Gibson (Ironbark, 1846–1921, A)
Wilfrid Wilson Gibson (1878–1962, E)
Elsa Gidlow (1898–1986, C)
Angus Morrison Gidney (1803–1882, C)
Gerry Gilbert (1936–2009, C)
Jack Gilbert (1925–2012, US)
Kevin Gilbert (1933–1993, A)
W. S. Gilbert (1836–1911, E)
Ellen Gilchrist (born 1935, US)
George Gilfillan (1813–1878, S)
Charlotte Perkins Gilman (1860–1935, US)
Mary Gilmore (1865–1962, A)
Allen Ginsberg (1926–1997, US)
Dana Gioia (born 1950, US)
Nikki Giovanni (born 1943, US)
Jesse Glass (born 1954, US/Jp)
John Glassco (1909–1981, C)
Madeline Gleason (1903–1979, US)
Duncan Glen (1933–2008, S)
William Glen (1789–1826, S)
Lorri Neilsen Glenn (living, C)
Denis Glover (1912–1980, NZ)
Louise Glück (born 1943, US)
Rumer Godden (1907–1998, In/E)
Patricia Goedicke (1931–2006, US)
Oliver St. John Gogarty (1878–1957, Ir)
Albert Goldbarth (born 1948, US)
Kenneth Goldsmith (born 1961, US)
Oliver Goldsmith (1728–1774, Ir/E)
Oliver Goldsmith (1794–1861, C)
Peter Goldsworthy (born 1951, A)
Leona Gom (born 1946, C)
W. T. Goodge (1862–1909, A)
Lorna Goodison (born 1947, J)
Paul Goodman (1911–1972, US)
Barnabe Googe (1540–1594, E)
Adam Lindsay Gordon (1833–1870, A)
Katherine L. Gordon (living, C)
Robert Gordon of Straloch (1580–1661, S)
Hedwig Gorski (born 1949, US)
Edmund Gosse (1849–1928, E)
Phyllis Gotlieb (1926–2009, C)
Keith Gottschalk (born 1946, SA)
Alan Gould (born 1949, A)
Nora Gould (living, C)
John Gower (c. 1330–1408, E)
Susan Goyette (born 1964, C)

Gr–Gy
James Graham, 1st Marquess of Montrose (1612–1650, S)
Jorie Graham (born 1950, US)
Neile Graham (born 1958, C)
Robert Cunninghame Graham of Gartmore (1735–1797, S)
W. S. Graham (1918–1986, S)
James Grahame (1765–1811, S)
Mark Granier (born 1957, E/Ir)
Paul Grano (1894–1975, A)
Alex Grant (living, US)
Richard Graves (1715–1804, E)
Richard Harry Graves (1897–1971, A)
Robert Graves (1895–1985, E)
Alexander Gray (1882–1968, S)
Catherine Gray, Lady Manners (1766–1852, Ir)
Kathryn Gray (born 1973, W)
Maxwell Gray (Mary Gleed Tuttiett, 1846–1923, E)
Robert Gray (born 1945, A)
Stephen Gray (born 1941, SA)
Thomas Gray (1716–1771, E)
Dorothy Auchterlonie Green (1915–1991, A)
H. M. Green (1881–1962, A)
Paula Green (born 1955, NZ)
Richard Greene (born 1961, C)
Robert Greene (1558–1592, E)
Lavinia Greenlaw (born 1962, E)
Gavin Greenlees (1930–1983, A)
Leslie Greentree (living, C)
Dora Greenwell (1821–1882, E)
Jane Greer (born 1953, US)
Linda Gregg (1942–2019, US)
Horace Gregory (1898–1982, US)
Andrew Greig (born 1951, S)
Eamon Grennan (born 1941, Ir)
H. W. Gretton (1914–1983, NZ)
Fulke Greville, 1st Baron Brooke (1554–1628, E)
Gerald Griffin (1803–1840, Ir)
Sarah Maria Griffin (living, Ir)
Susan Griffin (born 1943, US)
Bill Griffiths (1948–2007, E)
Bryn Griffiths (living, W/E)
Jane Griffiths (born 1970, E)
Geoffrey Grigson (1905–1985, E)
Nicholas Grimald (1519–1562, E)
Angelina Weld Grimké (1880–1958, US)
Charlotte Forten Grimké (1837–1914, US)
Eliza Griswold (born 1973, US)
Rufus Wilmot Griswold (1815–1857, US)
Philip Gross (born 1952, E)
Paul Groves (born 1947, E/W)
Bertha Jane Grundy (Mrs. Leith Adams, 1837–1912, E)
Jeff Guess (born 1948, A)
Barbara Guest (1920–2006, US)
Edgar Guest (1881–1959, US)
Paul Guest (living, US)
Malcolm Guite (born 1957, E)
Arthur Guiterman (1871–1943, US)
Genni Gunn (born 1949, C)
Thom Gunn (1929–2004, E/US)
Kristjana Gunnars (born 1948, C)
Lee Gurga (born 1949, US)
Ivor Gurney (1890–1937, E)
Ralph Gustafson (1909–1995, C)
Mafika Gwala (1946–2014, SA)
Cyril Gwynn (1897–1988, W/A)
Stephen Gwynn (1864–1950, Ir)
Beth Gylys (born 1964, US)
Brion Gysin (1916–1986, C/E)

H

Ha–He
William Habington (1605–1654, E)
Marilyn Hacker (born 1942, US)
John Haines (1924–2011, US)
Paul Haines (1933–2003, US/C)
Helen Hajnoczky (born 1985, C)
Thomas Gordon Hake (1809–1895, E)
Sarah Josepha Hale (1788–1879, US)
Bernadette Hall (born 1945, NZ)
Donald Hall (1928–2018, US)
Megan Hall (born 1972, SA)
Phil Hall (born 1953, C)
Radclyffe Hall (1880–1943, E)
Rodney Hall (born 1935, A)
Arthur Hallam (1811–1833, E)
Alan Halsey (born 1949, W/E)
Michael Hamburger (1924–2007, E)
Ian Hamilton (1938–2001, E)
Jane Eaton Hamilton (born 1954, C)
Janet Hamilton (1795–1873, S)
Philip Hammial (born 1937, A)
Robert Gavin Hampson (born 1948, E)
Susan Hampton (born 1949, A)
Sophie Hannah (born 1971, E)
Kerry Hardie (born 1951, NI)
Thomas Hardy (1840–1928, E)
Lesbia Harford (1891–1927, A)
Joy Harjo (born 1951, US)
William Harmon (born 1938, US)
Frances Harper (1825–1911, US)
Michael S. Harper (1938–2016 US)
Charles Harpur (1813–1868, A)
Alice Harriman (1861–1925, US)
Edward Harrington (1895–1966, A)
Claire Harris (1937–2018, C)
Joseph Harris (1773–1825, W)
Max Harris (1921–1995, A)
Michael Harris (born 1944, C)
Robert Harris (1951–1993, A)
Wilson Harris (1921–2018, Gu/E)
Jennifer Harrison (born 1955, A)
Jim Harrison (1937–2016, US)
Martin Harrison (1949–2014, A)
Richard Harrison (poet) (living, C)
Tony Harrison (born 1937, E)
Les Harrop (born 1948, E/A)
Molly Harrower (1906–1999, S)
J. S. Harry (1939–2015, A)
Carla Harryman (born 1952, US)
David Harsent (born 1942, E)
Kevin Hart (born 1954, A)
Paul Hartal (born 1936, Is/C)
Anne Le Marquand Hartigan (living, Ir)
Jill Hartman (born 1974, C)
Sadakichi Hartmann (1867–1944, US)
Michael Hartnett (1941–1999, Ir)
Diana Hartog (born 1942, C)
William Hart-Smith (1911–1990, NZ)
F. W. Harvey (1888–1957, E)
Elisabeth Harvor (living, C)
Gwen Harwood (1920–1995, A)
Lee Harwood (1939–2015, E)
Alamgir Hashmi (born 1951, E)
J. H. Haslam (1874–1969, NZ)
Nicholas Hasluck (born 1942, A)
Robert Hass (born 1941, US)
Katherine Hastings (living, US)
Ann Hatton (1764–1838, W)
Stephen Hawes (died 1523, E)
Robert Stephen Hawker (1803–1875, E)
Kathleen Hawkins (1883–1981, NZ)
George Campbell Hay (1915–1984, S)
Gilbert Hay (born c. 1403, S)
Myfanwy Haycock (1913–1963, W/E)
Robert Hayden (1913–1980, US)
William Hayley (1745–1820, E)
Robert Hayman (1575–1629, Nf)
Tony Haynes (born 1960, US)
Joel Hayward (born 1964, NZ)
Eliza Haywood (c. 1693–1756, E)
H.D. (Hilda Doolittle, 1886–1961, E)
Randolph Healy (born 1956, Ir)
Seamus Heaney (1939–2013, Ir)
Josephine D. Heard (1861 – c. 1921, US)
John Heath-Stubbs (1918–2006, E)
Charles Heavysege (1816–1876, C)
James Hebblethwaite (1857–1921, A)
Anthony Hecht (1923–2004, US)
Jennifer Michael Hecht (born 1965, US)
John Hegley (born 1953, E)
Wilfrid Heighington (1897–1945, C)
Steven Heighton (1961–2022, C)
Anita Heiss (born 1968, A)
Lyn Hejinian (born 1941, US)
Jill Hellyer (1925–2012, A)
David Helwig (1938–2018, C)
Maggie Helwig (born 1961, C)
Felicia Hemans (1793–1835, E)
Kris Hemensley (born 1946, A)
Essex Hemphill (1957–1995, US)
Brian Henderson (born 1948, C)
Hamish Henderson (1919–2002, S)
Philip Henderson (1906–1977, E)
Thomas William Heney (1862–1928, A)
John Henley (1692–1756, E)
William Ernest Henley (1849–1903, E)
Adrian Henri (1932–2000, E)
Paul Henry (born 1959, W)
Robert Henryson (fl. 1460–1500, S)
Thomas Nicoll Hepburn (wrote as Gabriel Setoun, 1861–1930, S)
Dorothea Herbert (c. 1767–1829, Ir)
Edward Herbert, 1st Baron Herbert of Cherbury (1582–1648, E/W)
George Herbert (1593–1632, W)
Mary Herbert, Countess of Pembroke (Mary Sidney, 1561–1621, E)
W. N. Herbert (born 1961, S)
Jason Heroux (born 1971, C)
Robert Herrick (1591–1674, E)
Steven Herrick (born 1958, A)
Benjamin Hertwig (living, C)
Thomas Kibble Hervey (1799–1959, E)
Phoebe Hesketh (1909–2005, E)
Paul Hetherington (born 1958, A)
William Maxwell Hetherington (1803–1865, S)
Dorothy Hewett (1923–2002, A)
John Hewitt (1907–1987, NI)
Maurice Hewlett (1861–1923, E)
William Heyen (born 1940, US)
Thomas Heywood (c. 1570s – 1650, E)

Hi–Hu
Bob Hicok (born 1960, US)
Dick Higgins (1938–1998, US)
F. R. Higgins (1896–1941, Ir)
Kevin Higgins (born 1967, Ir)
Rita Ann Higgins (born 1955, Ir)
Colleen Higgs (born 1962, SA)
Charles Higham (1931–2012, A)
Scott Hightower (born 1952, US)
Conrad Hilberry (1928–2017, US)
Fiona Hile (living, A)
Barry Hill (born 1943, A)
Edward Hill (1843–1923, US)
Geoffrey Hill (1932–2016, E/US)
Robert Hilles (born 1951, C)
Richard Hillman (born 1964, A)
Ellen Hinsey (born 1960, US)
Jane Hirshfield (born 1953, US)
George Hitchcock (1914–2010, US)
H. L. Hix (born 1960, US)
Thomas Hoccleve (c. 1368–1426, E)
Philip Hodgins (1959–1995, A)
Ralph Hodgson (1871–1962, E/US)
W. N. Hodgson (1893–1916, E)
Barbara Hofland (1770–1844, E)
Michael Hofmann (born 1957, G/US)
James Hogg (1770–1835, S)
David Holbrook (1923–2011, E)
Susan Holbrook (living, C)
Thomas Holcroft (1745–1809, E)
Clive Holden (living, C)
Margaret Holford (1778–1852, E)
Abraham Holland (died 1626, E)
Barbara Holland (1933–2010, US)
Hugh Holland (1569–1633, W)
Jane Holland (born 1966, E)
John Holland (1794–1872, E)
Norah M. Holland (1876-1925, C)
Sarah Holland-Batt (born 1982, A)
John Hollander (1929–2013, US)
Matthew Hollis (born 1971, E)
Anselm Hollo (1934–2013, US)
Nancy Holmes (born 1959, C)
Oliver Wendell Holmes, Sr. (1809–1894, US)
Thomas Hood (1798–1845, E)
Cornelia Hoogland (living, C)
Ellen Sturgis Hooper (1812–1848, US)
Hilda Mary Hooke (1898–1978, C)
Harry Hooton (1908–1961, A)
A. D. Hope (1907–2000, A)
Christopher Hope (born 1944, SA)
Gerard Manley Hopkins (1844–1889, E)
Leah Horlick (living, C)
Sean Horlor (born 1981, C)
Frances Horovitz (1938–1983, E)
Michael Horovitz (1935–2021, E)
Peter Horn (1934–2019, SA)
George Moses Horton (1797–1884, US)
Allan Kolski Horwitz (born 1952, SA)
Sylvester Houédard (1924–1992, Gy)
Karen Houle (living, C)
Joan Houlihan (living, US)
A. E. Housman (1859–1936, E)
Edward Howard (1793–1841, E) 
Henry Howard, Earl of Surrey (1517–1547, E)
Liz Howard (living, C)
Richard Howard (born 1929, US)
Robert Guy Howarth (1906–1974, A)
Fanny Howe (born 1940, US)
George Howe (1769–1821, A)
Julia Ward Howe (1819–1910, US)
Susan Howe (born 1937, US)
Ada Verdun Howell (1902–1981, A)
Anthony Howell (born 1945, E)
Harry Howith (1934–2014, C)
Mary Howitt (1799–1888, E)
Richard Howitt (1799–1869, E)
William Howitt (1792–1879, E)
Francis Hubert (died 1629, E)
Thomas Hudson (d. c. 1605, S)
Frieda Hughes (born 1960, A)
Langston Hughes (1902–1967, US)
Richard Hughes (1900–1976, E/W)
Ted Hughes (1930–1998, E)
Richard Hugo (1923–1982, US)
Coral Hull (born 1965, A)
Lynda Hull (1954–1994, US)
T. E. Hulme (1883–1917, E)
Alexander Hume (c. 1560–1609, S)
Anna Hume (fl. 1644, S)
David Hume of Godscroft (1558–1629, S)
Barry Humphries (born 1934, A/E)
Emyr Humphreys (1919–2020, W)
Helen Humphreys (born 1961, C)
Leigh Hunt (1784–1859, E)
Sam Hunt (born 1946, NZ)
Aislinn Hunter (living, C)
Al Hunter (living, C)
Bruce Hunter (born 1952, C)
Catherine Hunter (born 1957, C)
Rex Hunter (1889–1960, NZ)
Constance Hunting (1925–2006, US)
Cynthia Huntington (born 1952, US)
Chris Hutchinson (born 1972, C)
Pearse Hutchinson (1927–2012, Ir)
William Hutton (1723–1815, E)
Aldous Huxley (1894–1963, E)
Douglas Smith Huyghue (1816–1891, C/A)
Douglas Hyde (1860–1949, Ir)
Robin Hyde (pen name of Iris Wilkinson; 1906–1939, NZ)
Helen von Kolnitz Hyer (1896–1983, US)
Maureen Hynes (living, C)

I

John Imlah (1799–1846, S)
Rex Ingamells (1913–1955, A)
Jean Ingelow (1820–1897, E)
P. Inman (born 1947, US)
Susan Ioannou (born 1944, C)
Valentin Iremonger (1918–1991, Ir)
Eric Irvin (1908–1993, A)
Frances Itani (born 1942, C)
Helen Ivory (born 1969, E)

J

Alan Jackson (born 1938, S)
Violet Jacob (1863–1946, S)
Josephine Jacobsen (1908–2003, US)
Ethel Jacobson (1899–1991, US)
Richard Jago (1715–1781, E)
James I of Scotland (1394–1437, S)
James VI and I (1566–1625, S/E)
Alan James (living, SA)
Clive James (1939–2019, A)
John James (1939–2018, W/E)
Maria James (1793–1868, W/US)
Kathleen Jamie (born 1962, S)
Robert Alan Jamieson (born 1958, S)
Patricia Janus (1932–2006, US)
Mark Jarman (born 1952, US)
Lisa Jarnot (born 1967, US)
Randall Jarrell (1914–1965, US)
Alan Jefferies (born 1957, A)
Robinson Jeffers (1887–1962, US)
Rod Jellema (1927–1918, US)
Jemeni (Joanne Gairy, born 1976, Gd/C)
Graham Jenkin (born 1938, A)
John Jenkins (born 1949, A)
Joseph Jenkins (1818–1898, W/A)
Mike Jenkins (born 1953, W)
Nigel Jenkins (1949–2014, W)
Elizabeth Jennings (1926–2001, E)
Kate Jennings (1948–2021, A)
Wopko Jensma (1939–1993 or after, SA)
Sydney Jephcott (1864–1951, A)
Paulette Jiles (born 1943, US/C)
Liesl Jobson (living, SA)
Rita Joe (1932–2007, C)
Edmund John (1883–1917, E)
Godfrey John (living, W)
E. Pauline Johnson (1861–1913, C)
Fenton Johnson (born 1953, US)
Georgia Douglas Johnson (1880–1966, US)
Helene Johnson (1906–1995, US)
James Weldon Johnson (1871–1938, US)
Linton Kwesi Johnson (born 1952, J)
Lionel Johnson (1867–1902, E)
Samuel Johnson (1709–1784, E)
Sarah Johnson (born 1980, SA)
George Benson Johnston (1913–2004, C)
Martin Johnston (1947–1990, A)
Amanda Jones (1835–1914, US)
D. G. Jones (1929–2016, C)
David Jones (1895–1974, E)
Ebenezer Jones (1820–1860, E)
El Jones (living, C)
Emma Jones (born 1977, A)
Evan Jones (1931–2022, A)
Glyn Jones (1905–1995, W)
Jack Jones (born 1992, W)
Jill Jones (born 1951, A)
John Joseph Jones (1930–2000, A)
Patrick Jones (born 1965, W)
Rae Desmond Jones (1941–2017, A)
Richard Jones (living, US)
Terry Jones (1942–2020, W/E)
Erica Jong (born 1942, US)
Ben Jonson (1573–1637, E)
Julie Joosten (born 1980, US/C)
John Jordan (1930–1988, Ir)
June Jordan (1936–2002, J/US)
Anthony Joseph (born 1966, T/E)
Eve Joseph (born 1953, C)
Jenny Joseph (1932–2018, E)
Danilo Jovanovitch (1919–2015, A)
James Joyce (1882–1941, Ir/I)
Trevor Joyce (born 1947, Ir)
Frank Judge (living, US)
A. M. Juster (born 1956, US)
Donald Justice (1925–2004, US)

K

Jim Kacian (born 1953, US)
Aryan Kaganof (born 1964, SA)
Chester Kallman (1921–1975, US)
Surjeet Kalsey (living, C)
Smaro Kamboureli (living, C)
Ilya Kaminsky (born 1977, US)
Julie Kane (born 1952, US)
Adeena Karasick (born 1965, C/US)
Mary Karr (born 1955, US)
Julia Kasdorf (born 1962, US)
Laura Kasischke (born 1961, US)
Bob Kaufman (1925–1986, US)
Shirley Kaufman (1923–2016, US)
Rupi Kaur (born 1992, C)
Patrick Kavanagh (1904–1967, Ir)
Jackie Kay (born 1961, S)
Jayne Fenton Keane (living, A)
Lionel Kearns (born 1937, C)
Annie Keary (1825–1879, E)
Diane Keating (living, C)
John Keats (1795–1821, E)
John Keble (1792–1866, E)
Janice Kulyk Keefer (born 1952, C)
Weldon Kees (1914–1955, US)
Nancy Keesing (1923–1993, A)
Antigone Kefala (1935–2022, A)
Christopher Kelen (born 1958, A)
S. K. Kelen (born 1956, A)
Anne Kellas (born 1951, SA/A)
Isabella Kelly (1759–1857, S/E)
M. T. Kelly (born 1946, C)
Arthur Kelton (died c. 1550, E/W)
Penn Kemp (born 1944, C)
Henry Kendall (1839–1882, A)
Francis Kenna (1865–1932, A)
Cate Kennedy (born 1963, A)
Geoffrey Studdert Kennedy ("Woodbine Willy", 1883–1929, E)
Leo Kennedy (1907–2000, C)
Miranda Kennedy (born 1975, US)
Walter Kennedy (c. 1455 – c. 1508, S)
X. J. Kennedy (born 1929, US)
Jean Kent (born 1951, A)
Jane Kenyon (1947–1995, US)
Robert Kirkland Kernighan (1854–1926, C)
Jack Kerouac (1922–1969, US)
Sidney Keyes (1922–1943, E)
Keorapetse Kgositsile (1938–2018, SA/US)
Mimi Khalvati (born 1944, E)
Charles Kickham (1828–1882, Ir)
Anne Killigrew (1660–1685, E)
Joyce Kilmer (1886–1918, US)
Arthur Henry King (1910–2000, E/US)
Henry King (1592–1669, E)
William King (1663–1712, E)
Charles Kingsley (1819–1875, E)
Barbara Kingsolver (born 1955, US)
Galway Kinnell (1927–2014, US)
John Kinsella (born 1963, A)
Thomas Kinsella (born 1928, Ir)
Rudyard Kipling (1865–1936, E)
Olga Kirsch (1924–1997, SA/Is)
Roy Kiyooka (1926–1994, C)
Carolyn Kizer (1925–1914, US)
Barbara Klar (born 1966, C)
Sarah Klassen (born 1932, C)
A. M. Klein (1909–1972, C)
August Kleinzahler (born 1949, US)
Etheridge Knight (1931–1991, US)
Stephen Knight (born 1960, W/E)
Raymond Knister (1899–1932, C)
Kenneth Koch (1925–2002, US)
Ruth Ellen Kocher (born 1965, US)
Joy Kogawa (born 1935, C)
komninos (born 1950, A)
Yusef Komunyakaa (born 1947, US)
Ted Kooser (born 1939, US)
Shane Koyczan (born 1976, C)
Rustum Kozain (born 1966, SA)
Rudi Krausmann (1933–2019, A)
Ruth Krauss (1901–1993, US)
Carolyn Kreiter-Foronda (born 1946, US)
Uys Krige (1910–1987, SA)
Robert Kroetsch (1927–2011, C)
Antjie Krog (born 1952, SA)
Anton Robert Krueger (born 1971, SA)
Marilyn Krysl (born 1942, US)
Anatoly Kudryavitsky (born 1954, Ir)
Abhay Kumar (born 1980, In)
Mazisi Kunene (1930–2006, SA)
Tuli Kupferberg (1923–2010, US)
Maxine Kumin (1925–2014, US)
Stanley Kunitz (1905–2006, US)
Frank Kuppner (born 1951, S)
Stephen Kuusisto (born 1955, US)
Morris Kyffin (c. 1555–1598, W/E)
Joanne Kyger (1934–2017, US)
Francis Kynaston (1587–1642, E)

L

La–Ln
John La Rose (1927–2006, J/E)
Sonnet L'Abbé (born 1973, C)
Edward A. Lacey (1938–1995, C)
Mike Ladd (born 1959, A)
Ben Ladouceur (born 1987, C)
Nick Laird (born 1975, NI)
David Lake (1929–2016, A)
Philip Lamantia (1927–2005, US)
Kendrick Lamar (born 1987, US)
Charles Lamb (1775–1834, E)
Archibald Lampman (1861–1899, C)
Tim Lander (born 1938, C)
Letitia Elizabeth Landon (1802–1838, E)
Walter Savage Landor (1775–1864, E)
M. Travis Lane (born 1934, US/C)
Patrick Lane (1939–2019, C)
Andrew Lang (1844–1912, S)
D. L. Lang (born 1983, US)
William Langland (c. 1332 – c. 1386, E)
Eve Langley (1904–1974, A)
Emilia Lanier (1569–1645, E)
Sidney Lanier (1842–1881, US)
Lucy Larcom (1824–1893, US)
Rebecca Hammond Lard (1772–1855, US)
Bruce Larkin (born 1957, US)
Philip Larkin (1922–1985, E)
Richard Latewar (1560–1601, E) 
Evelyn Lau (born 1971, C)
James Laughlin (1914–1997, US)
Ann Lauterbach (born 1942, US)
Dorianne Laux (born 1952, US)
Emily Lawless (1845–1913, Ir)
Anthony Lawrence (born 1957, A)
D. H. Lawrence (1885–1930, E)
Henry Lawson (1867–1922, A)
Louisa Lawson (1848–1920, A)
Robert Lax (1915–2000, US)
Layamon (late 12th – early 13th c., E)
Irving Layton (1912–2006, C)
Emma Lazarus (1849–1887, US)
Augustus Asplet Le Gros (1840–1877, Je)
Bronwyn Lea (living, A)
Mary Leapor (1722–1746, E)
Edward Lear (1812–1888, E)
Lesley Lebkowicz (born 1946, A)
Francis Ledwidge (1887–1917, Ir)
David Lee (born 1944, US)
Dennis Lee (born 1939, C)
John B. Lee (born 1951, C)
Muna Lee (1895–1965, US)
Lily Alice Lefevre (1854–1938, C)
Joy Leftow (born 1949, US)
Sylvia Legris (born 1960, C)
Ursula K. Le Guin (1929–2018, US)
David Lehman (born 1948, US)
Geoffrey Lehmann (born 1940, A)
Brad Leithauser (born 1953, US)
Mark Lemon (1809–1870, E)
Sue Lenier (born 1957, E)
Charlotte Lennox (c. 1730–1804, S/E)
John Lent (living, C)
John Leonard (born 1965, A)
Tom Leonard (1944–2018, S)
William Ellery Leonard (1876–1944, US)
Douglas LePan (1914–1998, C)
Ben Lerner (born 1979, US)
Alex Leslie (living, C)
Rika Lesser (born 1953, US)
Lilian Leveridge (1879–1953, C)
Denise Levertov (1923–1997, E/US)
Dana Levin (born 1965, US)
Philip Levine (1928–2015, US)
Larry Levis (1946–1996, US)
D. A. Levy (1942–1968, US)
William Levy (1939–2019, US/Nt)
Emma Lew (born 1962, A)
Oswald LeWinter (1931–2013, US)
Alun Lewis (1915–1944, W)
C. S. Lewis (1898–1963, Ir/E)
Gwyneth Lewis (born 1959, W)
J. Patrick Lewis (born 1942, US)
Wyndham Lewis (1882–1957, E)
Anne Ley (c. 1599–1641, E)
Tim Liardet (born 1959, E)
Isabella Lickbarrow (1784–1847, E)
James Liddy (1934–2008, Ir)
Tim Lilburn (born 1950, C)
Charles Lillard (1944–1997, C)
Kate Lilley (born 1960, A)
Tao Lin (born 1983, US)
Ada Limón (born 1976, US)
Jack Lindeman (living, US)
Eddie Linden (born 1935, S/E)
Anne Morrow Lindbergh (1906–2001, US)
Jack Lindsay (1900–1990, A/E)
Maurice Lindsay (1918–2009, S)
Sarah Lindsay (born 1958, US)
Vachel Lindsay (1879–1931, US)
Jessie Litchfield (1883–1956, A)
Dorothy Livesay (1909–1996, C)
Billie Livingston (living, C)
Douglas Livingstone (1932–1996, SA)

Lo–Ly
Douglas Lochhead (1922–2011, C)
Liz Lochhead (born 1947, S)
Terry Locke (born 1946, NZ)
Thomas Lodge (1556–1625, E)
John Logan (1748–1788, S/E)
Christopher Logue (1926–2011, E)
James Longenbach (living, US)
Henry Wadsworth Longfellow (1807–1882, US)
Michael Longley (born 1939, NI)
John Longmuir (1803–1883, S)
Audre Lorde (1934–1992, US)
LindaAnn Loschiavo (living, US)
Marguerite St. Leon Loud (1812-1889, US)
Jennifer LoveGrove (living, C)
Richard Lovelace (1618–1658, E)
Henry Lovelich (fl. mid-15th c., E)
Samuel Lover (1797–1868, Ir/E)
Amy Lowell (1874–1925, US)
James Russell Lowell (1819–1891, US)
Maria White Lowell (1821–1853, US)
Robert Lowell (1917–1977, US)
Pat Lowther (1935–1975, C)
Mina Loy (1882–1966, E/US)
Edward Lucie-Smith (born 1933, E)
Fitz Hugh Ludlow (1836–1870, US)
Tatjana Lukić (1959–2008, A)
Suzanne Lummis (living, US)
Laura Lush (born 1959, C)
Richard Lush (born 1934, C)
Thomas Lux (1946–2017, US)
John Lydgate (1370–1450, E)
John Lyly (1553–1606, E)
Michael Lynch (1944–1991, US/C)
David Lyndsay (c. 1490 – c. 1555, S)
P. H. B. Lyon (1893–1986, E)
Henry Francis Lyte (1793–1847, S)
George Lyttelton Lord Lyttelton (1709–1773, E)

M

Ma–Mi

Rozena Maart (born 1962, SA/C)
Lindiwe Mabuza (born 1938, US/SA)
Frederick Macartney (1887–1980, A)
Thomas Babington Macaulay (1800–1859, E)
George MacBeth (1932–1992, S)
Norman MacCaig (1910–1996, S)
Denis Florence MacCarthy (1817–1882, Ir)
Karen Mac Cormack (born 1956, C/US)
Hugh MacDiarmid (1892–1978, S)
Donagh MacDonagh (1912–1968, Ir)
Thomas MacDonagh (1878–1916, Ir)
Allan MacDonald (1859–1905, S)
Elizabeth Roberts MacDonald (1864-1922, C)
George Macdonald (1824–1905, S)
Hugh MacDonald (born 1945, C)
Wilson MacDonald (1880–1967, C)
Patrick MacDonogh (1902–1961, Ir)
Gwendolyn MacEwen (1941–1987, C)
Seán Mac Falls (born 1957, Ir)
Walter Scott MacFarlane (1896–1979, C)
Patrick MacGill (1889–1963, Ir)
Alasdair Alpin MacGregor (1899–1970, S)
Ronald Campbell Macfie (1867–1931, S)
James Pittendrigh Macgillivray (1856–1938, S)
Thomas MacGreevy (1893–1967, Ir)
Arthur Machen (1863–1947, W/E)
Tom MacInnes (1867–1951, C)
Louise Mack (1870–1935, A)
John William Mackail (1859–1945, S)
John Macken (c. 1784–1823, Ir)
Lachlan Mackinnon (born 1956, S)
Compton Mackenzie (1883–1972, S)
Kenneth Mackenzie (Seaforth Mackenzie, 1913–1955, A)
Archibald MacLeish (1892–1982, US)
Dorothea Mackellar (1885–1968, A)
Don Maclennan (1929–2009, SA)
Joseph Macleod (1903–1984, E)
Nathaniel Mackey (born 1947, US)
Don Maclennan (1929–2009, SA)
Jackson Mac Low (1922–2004, US)
Louis MacNeice (1907–1963, Ir/E)
Kevin MacNeil (living, S)
Hector Macneill (1746–1818, S)
Lachlan Mackinnon (born 1956, S)
Alasdair Maclean (1926–1994, S)
Archibald MacLeish (1892–1982, US)
Andrea MacPherson (living, C)
James Macpherson (1736–1796, S)
Jay Macpherson (1931–2012, C)
Barry MacSweeney (1948–2000, E)
Haki R. Madhubuti (born 1942, US)
John Gillespie Magee, Jr. (1922–1941, C)
Wes Magee (born 1939, S)
Jayanta Mahapatra (born 1928, In)
Sitakant Mahapatra (born 1937, In)
Mzi Mahola (born 1949, SA)
Derek Mahon (born 1941, NI)
Jennifer Maiden (born 1949, A)
Keith Maillard (born 1942, US/C)
Charles Mair (1838–1827, C)
Alice Major (born 1949, C)
Clarence Major (born 1936, US)
Robert Majzels (born 1950, C)
Taylor Mali (born 1965, US)
David Mallet (c. 1705–1765, S)
Thomas Malory (c. 1415–1471, E)
David Malouf (born 1934, A)
Kim Maltman (born 1951, C)
Eli Mandel (1922–1992, C)
Tom Mandel (born 1942, US)
Ahdri Zhina Mandiela (born 1953, J/C)
James Clarence Mangan (1803–1849, Ir)
Bill Manhire (born 1946, NZ)
David Manicom (born 1960, C)
John Manifold (1915–1985, A)
Leonard Mann (1895–1981, A)
Emily Manning (1845–1890, A)
Frederic Manning (1882–1935, A)
Maurice Manning (born 1966, US)
Ruth Manning-Sanders (1886–1988, W)
Robert Mannyng (1269–1340, E)
Chris Mansell (born 1953, A)
Peter Manson (born 1969, S)
Lee Maracle (1950–2021, C)
Blaine Marchand (born 1949, C)
Morton Marcus (1936–2009, US)
Paul Mariani (born 1940, US)
E. A. Markham (1939–2008, Mo/E)
Edwin Markham (1852–1940, US)
Nicole Markotic (born 1962, C)
Daphne Marlatt (born 1942, C)
Christopher Marlowe (1564–1593, E)
Don Marquis (1878–1937, US)
Edward Garrard Marsh (1783–1862, E)
Tom Marshall (1938–1993, C)
John Marston (1576–1634, E)
Garth Martens (living, C)
Camille Martin (born 1956, C)
David Martin (1915–1997, E/A)
Philip Martin (1931–2005, A)
Theodore Martin (1816–1909, S)
Sid Marty (born 1944, C)
Andrew Marvell (1621–1678, E)
John Masefield (1878–1967, E)
Lebogang Mashile (born 1979, SA)
R. A. K. Mason (1905–1971, NZ)
Edgar Lee Masters (1868–1950, US)
John Mateer (born 1971, A)
Ray Mathew (1929–2002, A)
Robin Mathews (born 1931, C)
Roland Mathias (1915–2007, W)
Cleopatra Mathis (born 1947, US)
Don Mattera (born 1935, SA)
James Matthews (born 1929, SA)
Glyn Maxwell (born 1962, E)
Bernadette Mayer (born 1945, US)
Micheline Maylor (born 1970, C)
Seymour Mayne (born 1944, C)
Chandra Mayor (born 1973, C)
Ben Mazer (born 1964, US)
Mzwakhe Mbuli (born 1959, SA)
James McAuley (1917–1976, A)
Robert McBride (c. 1811/1812–1895, C)
Neil McBride (1861–1942, Ir)
Ian McBryde (born 1953, A)
Brian McCabe (born 1951, S)
Steven McCabe (living, C)
Steve McCaffery (born 1947, C)
Julia McCarthy (living, C)
Susan McCaslin (born 1947, C)
J. D. McClatchy (1945–2018, US)
Kim McClenaghan (born 1974, SA/E)
Michael McClure (born 1932, US)
Kathleen McConnell (Kathy Mac, living, C)
David McCooey (born 1967, A)
George Gordon McCrae (1833–1927, A)
John McCrae (1872–1918, C)
Shane McCrae (born 1975, US)
Kathleen McCracken (born 1960, C)
John McCrae (1872–1918, C)
Ronald McCuaig (1908–1993, A)
Matthew McDiarmid (1914–1996, S)
Nan McDonald (1921–1974, A)
Roger McDonald (born 1941, A)
Roy McDonald (1937–2018, C)
Walt McDonald (born 1934, US)
David McFadden (1940–2018, C)
Hugh McFadden (living, Ir)
David McGimpsey (living, C)
Phyllis McGinley (1905–1978, US)
Elvis McGonagall (living, S)
William McGonagall (1825–1902, S)
Roger McGough (born 1937, E)
Michelle McGrane (born 1974, Z/SA)
Campbell McGrath (born 1962, US)
Thomas McGrath (1916–1990, US)
Wendy McGrath (living, C)
Medbh McGuckian (born 1950, NI)
Heather McHugh (born 1948, US)
William McIlvanney (1936–2015, S)
Nadine McInnis (born 1957, C)
James McIntyre (1828–1906, S/C)
Claude McKay (1889–1948, J/US)
Don McKay (born 1942, C)
Barry McKinnon (born 1944, C)
Rod McKuen (1933–2015, US)
Greg McLaren (born 1967, A)
Isaac McLellan (1806–1899, US)
John McLellan (early 19th century, E)
Brendan McLeod (born 1979, C)
Nigel McLoughlin (born 1968, NI)
Emily Julian McManus (1865-1918, C)
Rhyll McMaster (born 1947, A)
Susan McMaster (born 1950, C)
James L. McMichael (born 1939, US)
Ian McMillan (born 1956, E)
Eugene McNamara (1930–2016, US/C)
Anthony McNeill (1941–1996, J)
Andrew McNeillie (born 1946, W/E)
Hollie McNish (born 1984, E)
Bernard McNulty (1842–1892, US)
Steve McOrmond (living, C)
Dionyse McTair (born 1950, T)
Máighréad Medbh (born 1959, Ir]
Thomas Medwin (1788–1869, E)
Paula Meehan (born 1955, Ir)
Peter Meinke (born 1932, US)
Mary Melfi (born 1951, C)
Elizabeth Melville (c. 1578 – c. 1640, S)
Herman Melville (1819–1891, US)
Christopher Meredith (born 1955, W)
George Meredith (1828–1909, E)
Louisa Anne Meredith (1812–1895, E/A)
James Merrill (1926–1995, US)
Stuart Merrill (1863–1915, US)
Iman Mersal (born 1966, C)
Thomas Merton (1915–1968, US)
W. S. Merwin (1927–2019, US)
Sarah Messer (born 1966, US)
Joan Metelerkamp (born 1956, SA)
Charlotte Mew (1869–1928, E)
Bruce Meyer (born 1957, C)
Alice Meynell (1847–1922, E)
Viola Meynell (1885–1956, E)
James Lionel Michael (1824–1868, E/A)
Anne Michaels (born 1958, C)
William Julius Mickle (1734–1788, S)
Marianne Micros (living, C)
Christopher Middleton (c. 1560–1628, E)
Christopher Middleton (born 1926, E)
Richard Barham Middleton (1882–1911, E)
Thomas Middleton (1580–1627, E)
Roy Miki (born 1942, C)
Dorothy Miles (1931–1993, W/US)
Josephine Miles (1911–1985, US)
Jennifer Militello (living, US)
Edna St. Vincent Millay (1892–1950, US)
Alice Duer Miller (1874–1942, US)
Jane Miller (born 1949, US)
Joaquin Miller (1837–1913, US)
Leslie Adrienne Miller (born 1956, US)
Ruth Miller (1919–1969, SA)
Thomas Miller (1807–1874, E)
Vassar Miller (1924–1998, US)
John Millett (1921–2019, A)
Robert Millhouse (1788–1839, E)
Alice Milligan (1865–1953, Ir/NI)
Spike Milligan (1918–2002, E/Ir)
Kenneth G. Mills (1923–2004, C)
Roswell George Mills (1896–1966, C)
John Milton (1608–1674, E)
Robert Minhinnick (born 1952, W)
Matthew Minicucci (born 1981, US)
Gary Miranda (born 1939, US)
Sudesh Mishra (living, A)
Adrian Mitchell (1932–2008, E)
Paul Mitchell (born 1968, A)
Silas Weir Mitchell (1829–1914, US)
Stephen Mitchell (born 1943, US)
Waddie Mitchell (born 1950, US)
Naomi Mitchison (1897–1999, S)
Amitabh Mitra (living, SA)
Ange Mlinko (born 1960, US)

Mo–Mu
David Macbeth Moir (1798–1851, S)
Anis Mojgani (born 1977, US)
John Mole (born 1941, E)
Natalia Molebatsi (living, SA)
Dorothy Molloy (1942–2004, Ir)
Geraldine Monk (born 1952, E)
Harold Monro (1879–1932, E)
Harriet Monroe (1860–1936, US)
Charles Montagu, 1st Earl of Halifax (1661–1715, E)
John Montague (1929–2016, Ir)
Lady Mary Wortley Montagu (1689–1762, E)
Lenore Montanaro (born 1990, US)
Alexander Montgomerie (c. 1550–1598, S)
James Montgomery (1771–1854, E)
Lucy Maud Montgomery (L. M. Montgomery, 1874–1942, C)
Marion E. Moodie (1867–1958, C)
Susanna Moodie (1803–1885, E/C)
Kobus Moolman (living, SA)
Jacob McArthur Mooney (born 1983, C)
Alan Moore (born 1960, Ir)
Marianne Moore (1887–1972, US)
Merrill Moore (1903–1957, US)
Ruth Moore (1903–1989, US)
T. Inglis Moore (1901–1978, A)
Thomas Moore (1779–1852, Ir/E)
Thomas Sturge Moore (1870–1944, E)
Dom Moraes (1938–2004, In)
Barbara Moraff (born 1939, US)
Cherríe Moraga (born 1952, US)
Edythe Morahan de Lauzon (fl. early 20th c., C)
Pamela Mordecai (born 1942, J/C)
Hannah More (1745–1833, E)
Dwayne Morgan (born 1974, C)
Edwin Morgan (1920–2010, S)
J. O. Morgan (born 1978, S)
Jeffrey Morgan (living, C)
Mal Morgan (1936–1999, A)
Robin Morgan (born 1941, US)
Lorin Morgan-Richards (born 1975, US)
A. F. Moritz (born 1947, US/C)
Mervyn Morris (born 1937, J)
Sharon Morris (living, W/E)
William Morris (1834–1896, E)
David R. Morrison (1941–2012, S)
Jim Morrison (1943–1971, US)
Morrissey (born 1959, E)
Kim Morrissey (Janice Dales, living, C)
Garry Thomas Morse (living, C)
Viggo Mortensen (born 1958, US/De)
Colin Morton (born 1948, C)
Frank Morton (1869–1923, A)
Twm Morys (born 1961, W)
Daniel David Moses (born 1952, C)
Howard Moss (1922–1987, US)
Thylias Moss (born 1954, US)
Isabella Motadinyane (1963–2003, SA)
William Motherwell (1797–1835, S)
Andrew Motion (born 1952, E)
Seitlhamo Motsapi (born 1966, SA)
Casey Motsisi (1932–1977, SA)
Eric Mottram (1924–1995, E)
Erín Moure (born 1955, C)
Oswald Mbuyiseni Mtshali (born 1940, SA)
Ian Mudie (1911–1976, A)
Mudrooroo (Colin Thomas Johnson, 1938–2019, A)
Lisel Mueller (1924–2020, US)
Micere Githae Mugo (born 1942, K/Z)
Edwin Muir (1887–1959, S/E)
Paul Muldoon (born 1951, Ir/US)
Wendy Mulford (born 1941, W/E)
Harryette Mullen (born 1953, US)
Laura Mullen (born 1958, US)
Anthony Munday (c. 1560–1633, E)
Jane Munro (born 1943, C)
Sachiko Murakami (born 1980, C)
William Murdoch (1823–1887, S/C)
Edwin Greenslade Murphy (Dryblower, 1866–1939, A)
Hayden Murphy (born 1945, Ir)
Richard Murphy (1927–2018, Ir/SLk)
Sheila Murphy (born 1951, US)
Charles Murray (1864–1941, S)
George Murray (born 1971, C)
Joan Murray (born 1945, US)
Les Murray (1938–2019, A)
David Musgrave (born 1965, A)
Susan Musgrave (born 1951, C)
Togara Muzanenhamo (born 1975, Z)

N

Vladimir Nabokov (1899–1977, RE/US)
Constance Naden (1858–1889, E)
Sarojini Naidu (1879–1949, In)
Carolina Nairne (1766–1845, S)
Sydney Elliott Napier (1870–1940, A)
Akhtar Naraghi (living, C)
Ogden Nash (1902–1971, US)
Roger Nash (born 1942, E/C)
Thomas Nashe (1567–1601, E)
John Neal (1793–1876, US)
Charles Neaves (1800–1876, S)
Henry Neele (1798–1828, E)
Lyle Neff (born 1969, C)
John Neihardt (1881–1973, US)
William Neill (1922–2010, S)
Philip Neilsen (living, A)
Shaw Neilson (1872–1942, A)
Alice Dunbar Nelson (1875–1935, US)
Holly Nelson (living, US/C)
Marilyn Nelson (born 1946, US)
Howard Nemerov (1920–1991, US)
Kenn Nesbitt (born 1962, US)
W. H. New (born 1938, C)
Henry Newbolt (1862–1938, E)
John Newlove (1938–2003, C)
John Henry Newman (1801–1890, E)
Kate Newmann (born 1965, NI/Ir)
William Newton (1750–1830, E)
Aimee Nezhukumatathil (born 1974, US)
Nuala Ní Chonchúir (born 1970, Ir)
Eiléan Ní Chuilleanáin (born 1942, Ir)
Nuala Ní Dhomhnaill (born 1952, Ir)
Ailbhe Ní Ghearbhuigh (born 1984, Ir)
Doireann Ní Ghríofa (born 1981, Ir)
Nicholas of Guildford (12th or 13th c., E)
Barrie Phillip Nichol (bpNichol, 1944–1988, C)
Grace Nichols (born 1950, Gu/E)
Robert Nichols (1893–1944, E)
Cecily Nicholson (living, C)
Norman Nicholson (1914–1987, E)
Lorine Niedecker (1903–1970, US)
Emilia Nielsen (living, C)
Hume Nisbet (1849–1923, A/S)
Christopher Nolan (1965–2009, Ir)
Oodgeroo Noonuccal (1920–1993, A)
Leslie Norris (1921–2006, W/US)
Harry Northup (born 1940, US)
Arthur Nortje (1942–1970, SA)
Caroline Norton (1808–1877, E)
Alice Notley (born 1945, US)
Alden Nowlan (1933–1983, C)
Alfred Noyes (1880–1958, E)
Jeff Nuttall (1933–2004, E)
Naomi Shihab Nye (born 1952, US)
Robert Nye (1939–2016, E)

O

Joyce Carol Oates (born 1938, US)
John O'Brien (Patrick Joseph Hartigan, 1878–1952, A)
Sean O'Brien (born 1952, E)
Patrick O'Connell (1944–2005, C)
Mark O'Connor (born 1945, A)
Philip O'Connor (1916–1998, E)
Mary O'Donnell (born 1954, Ir)
Bernard O'Donoghue (born 1945, Ir)
Gregory O'Donoghue (1951–2005, Ir)
Bernard O'Dowd (1866–1953, A)
Dennis O'Driscoll (born 1954, Ir)
Ernest O'Ferrall (1881–1925, A)
Ron Offen (1930–2010, US)
William Henry Ogilvie (1869–1963, S)
Frank O'Hara (1926–1966, US)
John Bernard O'Hara (1862–1927, A)
Theodore O'Hara (1820–1867, US)
Pixie O'Harris (1903–1991, A)
Sharon Olds (born 1942, US)
Alexandra Oliver (living, C)
Mary Oliver (1935–2019, US)
Redell Olsen (born 1971, E)
Charles Olson (1910–1970, US)
Sheree-Lee Olson (born 1954, C)
Nessa O'Mahony (living, Ir)
Michael Ondaatje (born 1943, SLk/C)
Heather O'Neill (born 1973, C)
Henrietta O'Neill (1758–1793, Ir)
Mary Devenport O'Neill (1879–1976, Ir)
George Oppen (1908–1984, US)
Mary Oppen (1908–1990, US)
Antoine Ó Raifteiri (1784–1835, Ir)
Edward Otho Cresap Ord, II (1858–1923, US)
Dowell O'Reilly (1865–1923, A)
Peter Orlovsky (1933–2010, US)
John Ormond (1923–1990, W)
Frank Ormsby (born 1947, NI)
Gregory Orr (born 1947, US)
Arthur O'Shaughnessy (1844–1881, E)
Micheal O'Siadhail (born 1947, Ir)
Alicia Ostriker (born 1937, US)
Maggie O'Sullivan (born 1951, E)
Seumas O'Sullivan (1879–1958, Ir)
Niyi Osundare (born 1947, Ni/US)
Alice Oswald (born 1966, E)
John Oswald (died 1793, S)
Eoghan Ó Tuairisc (1919–1982, Ir)
Richard Outram (1930–2005, C)
Ouyang Yu (歐陽昱; born 1955, A)
Catherine Owen living, C)
Jan Owen (born 1940, A)
Wilfred Owen (1893–1918, E)

P

Susan Paddon (living, C)
Ruth Padel (born 1947, E)
Ron Padgett (born 1942, US)
Isabel Pagan (c. 1740–1821, S)
Geoff Page (born 1940, A)
P. K. Page (1916–2010, C)
Janet Paisley (1948–2018, S)
Grace Paley (1922–2007, E)
Francis Turner Palgrave (1824–1897, E)
Michael Palmer (born 1943, US)
Nettie Palmer (1885–1964, A)
Vance Palmer (1885–1959, A)
Sylvia Pankhurst (1882–1960, E)
William Williams Pantycelyn (W)
Aristides Paradissis (1923–2006, A)
Arleen Paré (born 1946, C)
Dorothy Parker (1893–1967, US)
Amy Parkinson (1855-1938, C)
Thomas Parnell (1670–1718, Ir/E)
Robert Parry (1540–1612, W)
Lisa Pasold (living, C)
John Pass (born 1947, C)
Linda Pastan (born 1932, US)
Kenneth Patchen (1911–1972, US)
Banjo Paterson (1864–1941, A)
Don Paterson (born 1963, S)
Coventry Patmore (1823–1896, E)
Brian Patten (born 1946, E)
Ian Patterson (born 1948, E)
Philip Kevin Paul (living, C)
Tom Paulin (born 1949, NI/E)
Ricardo Pau-Llosa (born 1954, Cu)
James Payn (1830–1898, E/S)
Molly Peacock (born 1947, US/C)
Thomas Love Peacock (1785–1866, E)
Patrick Pearse (1879–1916, Ir)
Soraya Peerbaye (living, C)
Pearl Poet (14th c., E)
Patrick Pearse (1879–1916, Ir)
James Larkin Pearson (1879–1981, US)
Neil Peart (1952–2020, C)
Kathleen Peirce (born 1956, US)
J. D. C. Pellow (1890–1960, E)
Nathan Penlington (living, W/E)
Anne Penny (1729–1784, W/E)
Margaret Pennyman (bap. 1685, d. 1733), E
Hilary Douglas Clark Pepler (1878–1951, E)
Sam Pereira (born 1949, US)
Lucia Perillo (1958–2016, US)
Grace Perry (1927–1987, A)
Alice E. Heckler Peters (1845-1921, US)
Lenrie Peters (1932–2009, Ga)
Robert Peters (1924–2014, US)
Pascale Petit (born 1953, W)
Mario Petrucci (born 1958, E)
W. T. Pfefferle (born 1962, C)
Anna Augusta Von Helmholtz-Phelan (1890-1964, US)
M. NourbeSe Philip (born 1947, T/C)
Ambrose Philips (1674–1749, E)
Katherine Philips (1631/1632–1664, E/W)
Ben Phillips (born 1947, C)
Eden Phillpotts (1862–1960, E)
Alison Pick (born 1975, C)
Tom Pickard (born 1946, E)
Leah Lakshmi Piepzna-Samarasinha (born 1975, US/C)
Marge Piercy (born 1936, US)
Laetitia Pilkington (c. 1709–1750, Ir/E)
Mary Pilkington (1761–1839, E)
Sarah Pinder (living, C)
Percy Edward Pinkerton (1855–1946, E)
Robert Pinsky (born 1940, US)
George Pirie (1799–1870, C)
Christopher Pitt (1699–1748, E)
Marie Pitt (1869–1948, A)
Ruth Pitter (1897–1992, E)
Al Pittman (1940–2001, C)
Marjorie Pizer (1920–2016, A)
Sylvia Plath (1932–1963, US/E)
William Plomer (1903–1973, SA/E)
Edward Plunkett, 18th Baron of Dunsany (1878–1957, Ir/E)
Joseph Plunkett (1887–1916, Ir)
Edgar Allan Poe (1809–1849, US)
Emily Pohl-Weary (born 1973, C)
Craig Poile (living, C)
Suman Pokhrel (born 1967, Ne)
Marcella Polain (born 1958, A)
Margaret Steuart Pollard (1904–1996, E)
Edward Pollock (1823–1858, US)
Robert Pollok (c. 1798–1827, S)
John Pomfret (1667–1702, E)
Marie Ponsot (1921–2019, US)
John Pook (born 1942, W/F)
Sandy Pool (living, C)
Marie Ponsot (1921–2019, US)
Alexander Pope (1688–1744, E)
Judith Pordon (born 1954, US)
Anna Maria Porter (1780–1832, E)
Dorothy Porter (1954–2008, A)
Hal Porter (1911–1984, A)
Peter Porter (1929–2010, A)
Rochelle Potkar (born 1979, In)
Robert Potter (1721–1804, E)
Charles Potts (born 1943, US)
Ezra Pound (1885–1972, US)
B. W. Powe (born 1955, C)
Craig Powell (born 1940, A)
Winthrop Mackworth Praed (1802–1839, E)
Claire Pratt (1921–1995, C)
E. J. Pratt (1882–1964, C)
Jack Prelutsky (born 1940, US)
Karen Press (born 1956, SA)
Thomas Preston (1537–1598, E)
Ron Pretty (born 1940, A)
Frank Prewett (1893–1962, C)
Nancy Price (1880–1970, E)
Richard Price (born 1966, S/E)
Robert Priest (born 1951, C)
F. T. Prince (1912–2003, E)
Thomas Pringle (1789–1834, S/SA)
Matthew Prior (1664–1721, E)
Pauline Prior-Pitt (living, S)
Adelaide Anne Procter (1825–1864, E)
Bryan Procter (1787–1874, E)
Kevin Prufer (born 1969, US)
J. H. Prynne (born 1936, E)
Sheenagh Pugh (born 1950, W/E)
Al Purdy (1918–2000, C)

Q

Andy Quan (born 1969, C/A)
Francis Quarles (1592–1644, E)
Peter Quennell (1905–1993, E)
Sina Queyras (living, C)
Roderic Quinn (1867–1949, A)

R

Ra–Ri
William Radice (born 1951, E)
Kenneth Radu (born 1945, C)
Sam Ragan (1915–1996, US)
Jennifer Rahim (born 1963, T)
Craig Raine (born 1944, E)
Kathleen Raine (1908–2003, US)
Carl Rakosi (1903–2004, US)
Walter Raleigh (1552 or 1554–1618, E)
James Ralph (1705–1762, US/E)
Raymond Ramcharitar (living, T)
Lesego Rampolokeng (born 1965, S)
Allan Ramsay (1686–1758, S)
Theodore Harding Rand (1835–1900, C)
Dudley Randall (1914–2000, US)
Julia Randall (1924–2005, US)
Thomas Randolph (1605–1635, E)
Jennifer Rankin (1941–1979, A)
Claudia Rankine (born 1963, J)
John Crowe Ransom (1888–1974, US)
Lennox Raphael (born 1939, J)
Stephen Ratcliffe (born 1948, US)
Angela Rawlings (born 1978, C)
Tom Raworth (1938–2017, E)
Herbert Read (1893–1968, E)
Angela Readman (born 1973, E)
James Reaney (1926–2008, C)
George Reavey (1907–1976, Ir)
Peter Redgrove (1932–2003, E)
Michael Redhill (born 1966, C)
Beatrice Redpath (1886-1937, C)
Henry Reed (1914–1986, E)
Ishmael Reed (born 1938, US)
Jeremy Reed (born 1951, Je)
Kerry Reed-Gilbert (1956–2019, A)
Ennis Rees (1925–2009, US)
Lizette Woodworth Reese (1856–1935, US)
Deryn Rees-Jones (living, E/W)
James Reeves (1909–1978, E)
Nell Regan (born 1969, Ir)
Alastair Reid (1926–2014, S)
Christopher Reid (born 1949, E)
D. C. Reid (born 1952, C)
Jamie Reid (1941–2015, C)
Azila Talit Reisenberger (living, SA)
James Reiss (1941–2016, US)
Joseph Relph (1712–1743, E)
Robert Rendall (1898–1967, S)
Kenneth Rexroth (1905–1982, US)
Oliver Reynolds (born 1957, W)
Charles Reznikoff (1894–1976, US)
Shane Rhodes (living, C)
Ernest Rhys (1859–1946, W/E)
Henry Rice (1585 or 1586–1651, W/E)
Stan Rice (1942–2002, US)
Adrienne Rich (1929–2012, US)
Dorothy Richardson (1873–1957, E)
John Richardson (1817–1886, E)
Robert Richardson (1850–1901, A)
Edgell Rickword (1898–1982, E)
Elizabeth Riddell (1910–1998, A)
Lola Ridge (1873–1941, US)
Laura Riding (1901–1991, US)
Anne Ridler (1912–2001, E)
Denise Riley (born 1948, E)
James Whitcomb Riley (1849–1916, US)
John Riley (1937–1978, E)
Peter Riley (born 1940, E)
Mary Roberts Rinehart (1876–1958, US)
Maurice Riordan (born 1953, Ir)
Alberto Ríos (born 1952, US)

Ro–Ru
E. M. Roach (Merton Maloney, 1915–1974, T)
Charles G. D. Roberts (1860–1943, C)
Emma Roberts (1794–1840, E)
Michael Roberts (1902–1948, E)
Edith Anne Robertson (1883–1973, S)
James Robertson (born 1958, S)
Lisa Robertson (born 1961, C)
Robin Robertson (born 1955, S)
Edwin Arlington Robinson (1869–1935, US)
Lennox Robinson (1886–1958, Ir)
Mary Robinson (1758–1800, E)
Matt Robinson (born 1974, C)
Roland Robinson (1912–1992, A)
Ajmer Rode (living, C)
Gordon Rodgers (born 1952, C)
W. R. Rodgers (1909–1969, NI)
Carmen Rodríguez (born 1948 Ch/C)
Judith Rodriguez (1936–2018, A)
Theodore Roethke (1908–1963, US)
Janet Rogers (born 1963, C)
Linda Rogers (born 1944, C)
Samuel Rogers (1763–1855, E)
Isabella Whiteford Rogerson (Isabella Whiteford, 1835–1905, Ir/C)
Matthew Rohrer (born 1972, US)
Mary Rolls (1775–1835, E)
Ethel Rolt Wheeler (1869–1958, E)
David Romtvedt (living, US)
Dilys Rose (born 1954, S)
Peter Rose (born 1955, A)
Raymond Roseliep (1917–1983, US)
Franklin Rosemont (1943–2009, US)
Penelope Rosemont (born 1942, US)
Isaac Rosenberg (1890–1918, E)
Joe Rosenblatt (1933–2019, C)
Gabriel Rosenstock (born 1949, Ir)
Laisha Rosnau (born 1972, C)
Alan Ross (1922–2001, E)
Bruce Ross (living, C)
Stuart Ross (living, C)
W. W. E. Ross (1894–1966, C)
Christina Rossetti (1830–1894, E)
Dante Gabriel Rossetti (1828–1882, E)
Jerome Rothenberg (born 1931, US)
Nancy-Gay Rotstein (living, C)
Anne Rouse (born 1954, US/E)
David Rowbotham (1924–2010, A)
Elizabeth Singer Rowe (1674–1737, E)
Nicholas Rowe (1674–1718, E)
Noel Rowe (1951–2007, A)
Stephen Rowe (born 1980, C)
Graham Rowlands (born 1947, A)
Richard Rowlands (1565–1630, E/Nt)
Samuel Rowlands (c. 1573–1630, E)
Rosemarie Rowley (born 1942, Ir)
Susanna Rowson (1762–1824, E/US)
Susanna Roxman (1946–2015, Sw)
Adam Rudden (born 1983, Ir)
Muriel Rukeyser (1913–1980, US)
Charlotte Runcie (born 1989, S)
George William Russell (1867–1935, Ir/E)
Nipsey Russell (1918–2005, US)
Brendan Ryan (born 1963, A)
Gig Ryan (born 1956, A)
Kay Ryan (born 1945, US)
Michael Ryan (born 1946, US)
Tracy Ryan (born 1964, A)
Thomas Rymer (c. 1643–1713, E)

S

Sa–Si
Charles Sackville (1643–1706, E)
Thomas Sackville (1536–1608, E)
Vita Sackville-West (1892–1962, E)
Benjamin Alire Sáenz (born 1954, US)
Maria Grace Saffery (1773–1858, E)
Lake Sagaris (born 1956, C/Ch)
Nandini Sahu (born 1973, In)
Arja Salafranca (born 1971, SA)
Trish Salah (living, C)
Nina Salaman (1877–1925, E)
Blanaid Salkeld (1880–1959, Ir)
Philip Salom (born 1950, A)
John Salusbury (1567–1612, W/E)
Thomas Salusbury (1612–1643, W/E)
Fiona Sampson (born 1963, E)
Sonia Sanchez (born 1934, US)
Carl Sandburg (1878–1967, US)
Peter Sanger (born 1943, C)
Charles Sangster (1822–1893, C)
Ann Sansom (living, E)
Clive Sansom (1910–1981, E/A)
Andrew Sant (born 1950, A)
Robyn Sarah (born 1949, C)
Jaydeep Sarangi (born 1973, India)
Dipti Saravanamuttu (born 1960, A)
May Sarton (1912–1995, US)
Siegfried Sassoon (1886–1967, E)
K. Satchidanandan (born 1948, In)
Esther Saunders (1793–1862, US)
Jen Saunders (born 1962, A)
Richard Savage (c. 1697–1743, E)
Jaya Savige (born 1978, A)
Leslie Scalapino (1944–2010, US)
Herman George Scheffauer (1876–1927, US)
Jacob Scheier (born 1980, C)
Libby Scheier (1946–2000, US/C)
Bel Schenk (born 1975, A)
Dennis Schmitz (1937–2019, US)
Pat Schneider (1934–2020, US)
Jane Johnston Schoolcraft (1800–1842, US)
Andreas Schroeder (born 1946, C)
Philip Schultz (born 1945, US)
James Schuyler (1923–1991, US)
Delmore Schwartz (1913–1966, US)
Stephen Scobie (born 1943, C)
Gregory Scofield (born 1966, C)
Alexander Scott (c. 1520 – c. 1583, S)
Alexander Scott (1920–1989, S)
Dennis Scott (1939–1991, J)
Duncan Campbell Scott (1862–1947, C)
F. R. Scott (1899–1985, C)
Frederick George Scott (1861–1944, C)
Geoffrey Scott (1884–1929, E)
John A. Scott (born 1948, A)
Margaret Scott (1934–2005, A)
Peter Dale Scott (born 1929, C)
Tom Scott (1918–1995, S)
Sir Walter Scott (1771–1832, S)
William Bell Scott (1811–1890, S)
Gil Scott-Heron (1949–2011, US)
Ann Scott-Moncrieff (1914–1943, S)
E. J. Scovell (1907–1999, E)
Maurice Scully (born 1952, Ir)
George Bazeley Scurfield (1920–1991, E)
Peter Seaton (1942–2010, US)
Charles Sedley (1639–1701, E)
Frederick Seidel (born 1936, US)
Hugh Seidman (born 1940, US)
Rebecca Seiferle (living, US)
Lasana M. Sekou (born 1959, SM)
Francis Sempill (c. 1616–1682, S)
Robert Sempill (c. 1595 – c. 1663, S)
Olive Senior (born 1941, J/C)
Sipho Sepamla (1932–2007, SA)
Mongane Wally Serote (born 1944, SA)
Nina Serrano (born 1934, US)
Robert W. Service (1874–1958, S/C)
Vikram Seth (born 1952, SM)
Elkanah Settle (1648–1724, E)
Anna Seward (1742–1809, E)
Anne Sexton (1928–1974, US)
John W. Sexton (born 1958, Ir)
Thomas Shadwell (1642–1692, E)
Kathy Shaidle (born 1964, C)
William Shakespeare (1564–1616, E)
Tupac Shakur (1971–1996, US)
Otep Shamaya (born 1979, US)
Eileen Shanahan (1901–1979, Ir)
Ntozake Shange (1948–2018, US)
Edward Shanks (1892–1953, E)
Jo Shapcott (born 1953, E)
Thomas Shapcott (born 1935, A)
Karl Shapiro (1913–2000, US)
Michael Sharkey (born 1946, A)
William Sharp (awa Fiona MacLeod, 1855–1905, S)
Brenda Shaughnessy (born 1970, US)
Luci Shaw (born 1928, E/US)
Owen Sheers (born 1974, W/E)
Percy Bysshe Shelley (1792–1822, E)
William Shenstone (1714–1763, E)
Nan Shepherd (1893–1981, S)
Francis Joseph Sherman (1871–1926, C)
Joseph Sherman (1945–2006, C)
Kate Brownlee Sherwood (1841-1914, US)
Carol Shields (1935–2003, US/C)
Trish Shields (living, C)
Thomas Shipman (1632–1680, E)
James Shirley (1596–1666, E)
Dora Adele Shoemaker (1873-1962, US)
Fredegond Shove (1889–1949, E)
Sandy Shreve (living, C)
Penelope Shuttle (born 1947, E)
Beau Sia (born 1976, US)
Mary Sidney (1561–1621, E)
Philip Sidney (1554–1586, E)
Melanie Siebert (living, C)
Eli Siegel (1902–1978, US)
Robert Siegel (1939–2012, US)
Jon Silkin (1930–1997, E)
Ron Silliman (born 1946, US)
Shel Silverstein (1930–1999, US)
Charles Simic (1938–2023, US)
Goran Simić (born 1952, Bo/C)
Bren Simmers (born 1976, C)
James Simmons (1933–2001, NI)
Anne Simpson (living, C)
Louis Simpson (1923–2012, J/US)
Matt Simpson (1936–2009, E)
R. A. Simpson (1929–2002, A)
Bennie Lee Sinclair (1939–2000, US)
Iain Sinclair (born 1943, W/E)
May Sinclair (1863–1946, E)
Sue Sinclair (living, C)
Tim Sinclair (born 1972, A)
Burns Singer (1928–1964, S)
Marilyn Singer (born 1948, US)
Sarah Singleton (born 1966, E)
George Sipos (living, C)
Peter Sirr (born 1960, Ir)
Lemn Sissay (born 1967, E)
C. H. Sisson (1914–2003, E)
Ari Sitas (born 1952, SA)
Edith Sitwell (1887–1964, E)
Osbert Sitwell (1892–1969, E)
Sacheverell Sitwell (1897–1988, E)

Sk–Sq
Sonja Skarstedt (1960–2009, C)
John Skelton (1460–1529, E)
Robin Skelton (1925–1997, E/C)
Douglas Reid Skinner (born 1949, SA)
Myra Sklarew (born 1934, US)
Ed Skoog (born 1971, US)
Zoë Skoulding (born 1967, W)
Peter Skrzynecki (born 1945, A)
Kenneth Slessor (1901–1971, A)
Daniel Sloate (1931–2009, C)
Edward Slow (1841–1925, E)
Adam Small (1936–2016, SA)
Carolyn Smart (born 1952, C)
Christopher Smart (1722–1771, E)
Elizabeth Smart (1913–1986, C)
A. J. M. Smith (1902–1980, C)
Alexander Smith (1830–1867, S)
Bruce Smith (born 1946, US)
Charlotte Turner Smith (1749–1806, E)
Clara Kathleen Smith (1911–2004, C)
Clark Ashton Smith (1893–1961, US)
Douglas Burnet Smith (born 1949, C)
Iain Crichton Smith (1928–1998, S)
John Smith (born 1927, C)
Malachi Smith (living, J)
Marc Smith (born 1949, US)
Margaret Smith (born 1958, US)
Michael Smith (1942–2014, Ir)
Michael V. Smith (living, C)
Patti Smith (born 1946, US)
Rod Smith (born 1962, US)
Ron Smith (born 1943, C)
Steven Ross Smith (born 1945, C)
Stevie Smith (1902–1971, E)
Sydney Goodsir Smith (1915–1975, S)
Tracy K. Smith (born 1972, US)
Vivian Smith (born 1933, A)
William Jay Smith (1918–2015, US)
Tobias Smollett (1721–1771, S)
W. D. Snodgrass (1925–2009, US)
Gary Snyder (born 1930, US)
Karen Solie (born 1966, C)
David Solway (born 1941, C)
William Somervile (1675–1742, E)
Cathy Song (born 1955, US)
Madeline Sonik (born 1960, C)
Edward Sorenson (1869–1939, A)
Charles Sorley (1895–1915, S)
Gary Soto (born 1952, US)
Carolyn Marie Souaid (born 1959, C)
Raymond Souster (1921–2012, C)
William Soutar (1898–1946, S)
Caroline Anne Southey (1786–1854, E)
Robert Southey (1774–1843, E)
Robert Southwell (1561–1595, E)
Wole Soyinka (born 1934, Ni)
Esta Spalding (living, US/C)
Heather Spears (born 1934, C/De)
Alan Spence (living, S)
Lewis Spence (1874–1955, S)
Anne Spencer (1882–1975, US)
Bernard Spencer (1909–1963, E)
Thomas Edward Spencer (1845–1911, A)
Stephen Spender (1909–1995, E)
Edmund Spenser (1552–1599, E)
Leonora Speyer (1872–1956, US)
Harriet Elizabeth Prescott Spofford (1835–1921, US)
Eintou Pearl Springer (born 1944, T)
Birk Sproxton (1943–2007, C)
J. C. Squire (1884–1958, E)
Geoffrey Squires (born 1942, NI)

St–Sy
William Stafford (1914–1993, US)
A. E. Stallings (born 1968, US)
Jon Stallworthy (1935–2014, E)
Harold Standish (1919–1972, C)
Ann Stanford (1916–1987, US)
Frank Stanford (1948–1978, US)
George Stanley (born 1937, US/C)
George Starbuck (1931–1996, US)
Carmine Starnino (born 1970, C)
Nicolette Stasko (born 1950, A)
C. K. Stead (born 1932, NZ)
Peter Steele (1939–2012, A)
Richard Steere (1643–1721, US)
John Steffler (born 1947, C)
Gertrude Stein (1874–1946, US)
Mattie Stepanek (1990–2004, US)
Ian Stephens (1955–1996, C)
James Stephens (1880–1950, Ir)
James Brunton Stephens (1835–1902, S)
George Stepney (1663–1707, E)
John Sterling (1806–1844, S)
Gerald Stern (born 1925, US)
Ricardo Sternberg (born 1948, C/US)
C. J. Stevens (born 1927, US)
Wallace Stevens (1880–1955, US)
Richard Stevenson (born 1952, C)
Robert Louis Stevenson (1850–1894, S)
Margo Taft Stever (living, US)
Amanda Stewart (born 1959, A)
Douglas Stewart (1913–1985, A)
Harold Stewart (1916–1995, A)
Shannon Stewart (living, C)
W. Gregory Stewart (living, C/US)
Trumbull Stickney (1874–1904, US)
John Stiles (living, C/E)
James Still (1906–2001, US)
Anne Stone (living, C)
Donna J. Stone (1933–1994, US)
Ruth Stone (1915–2011, US)
Lisa Gluskin Stonestreet (born 1968, US)
Edward Storer (1880–1944, E)
Randolph Stow (1935–2010, A)
Mark Strand (born 1934, US)
Jennifer Strauss (born 1933, A)
Sean Street (born 1946, E)
Agnes Strickland (1796–1874, E)
Adelle Stripe (born 1976, E)
Trumbull Stickney (1874–1904, US)
Donna J. Stone (1933–1994, US)
Billy Marshall Stoneking (1947–2016, A)
Lisa Gluskin Stonestreet (born 1968, US)
Edward Storer (1880–1944, E)
Eithne Strong (1923–1999, Ir)
Joseph Stroud (born 1943, US)
Betsy Struthers (born 1951, C)
John Struthers (1776–1853, S)
Jesse Stuart (1906–1984, US)
Abhi Subedi (born 1945)
John Suckling (1609–1642, E)
Julie Suk (born 1924, US)
Andrew Suknaski (1942–2012, C)
Alan Sullivan (1868–1947, C)
Aloysius Michael Sullivan (1896–1980, US)
Rosemary Sullivan (born 1947, C)
Maud Sulter (1960–2008, S)
Moez Surani (born 1979, C)
Kamala Surayya (1934–2009, In)
Efua Sutherland (1924–1996, Gh)
John Sutherland (1919–1956, C)
Robert Swanson (1905–1994, C)
Robert Sward (born 1933, US/C)
George Swede (born 1940, C)
Matthew Sweeney (1951–2018, Ir)
Cole Swensen (born 1955, US)
Karen Swenson (born 1936, US)
May Swenson (1913–1989, US)
Jonathan Swift (1667–1745, Ir/E)
Todd Swift (born 1966, C/E)
Algernon Charles Swinburne (1837–1909, E)
Randall Swingler (1909–1967, E)
Ieuan ap Hywel Swrdwal (c. 1430 – c. 1480, W)
Bobbi Sykes (1943–2010, A)
Joshua Sylvester (1563–1618, E)
Arthur Symons (1865–1945, E)
John Millington Synge (1871–1909, Ir)
Arthur Sze (born 1950, US)
George Szirtes (born 1948, E)
Anne Szumigalski (1922–1999, E/C)

T

Eileen Tabios (born 1960, US)
Proma Tagore (living, C)
Rabindranath Tagore (1861–1941, In)
Maria Takolander (born 1973, A)
Francis W. Tancred (1874–1925, E)
Robert Tannahill (1774–1810, S)
Dorothea Tanning (1910–2012, US)
Allen Tate (1899–1979, US)
James Tate (1943–2015, US)
Emma Tatham (1829–1855, E)
Andrew Taylor (born 1940, A)
Ann Taylor (1782–1866, E)
Bruce Taylor (born 1960, C)
Edward Taylor (1645–1729, E/US)
Emily Taylor (1795–1872, E)
Heather Taylor (living, C)
Henry Taylor (1800–1886, E)
Henry S. Taylor (born 1942, US)
Jane Taylor (1783–1824, E)
Rachel Annand Taylor (1876–1960, S)
Ruth Taylor (1961–2006, C)
Sara Teasdale (1883–1933, US)
Barry Tebb (born 1942, E)
Fiona Templeton (born 1951, S/E)
William Tennant (1784–1848, S)
Alfred, Lord Tennyson (1809–1892, E)
Frederick Tennyson (1807–1898, E)
John Terpstra (living, C)
Elaine Terranova (born 1939, US)
A. S. J. Tessimond (1902–1962, E)
Lucy Terry (c. 1730–1821, US)
Souvankham Thammavongsa (born 1978, C)
Celia Thaxter (1824–1894, US)
Ernest Thayer (1863–1940, US)
John Thelwall (1764–1834, E)
Sharon Thesen (born 1946, C)
Colin Thiele (1920–2006, A)
Kai Cheng Thom (living, C)
William Thom (1799–1848, S)
Thomas the Rhymer (Thomas Learmonth, c. 1220 – c. 1298, S)
Thomas of Hales (13th c., E)
D. M. Thomas (born 1935, E)
Dylan Thomas (1914–1953, W/E)
Edward Thomas (1878–1917, E)
Elizabeth Thomas (1675–1731, E)
Lorenzo Thomas (1944–2005, US)
R. S. Thomas (1913–2000, W)
William Thomas (1832–1878, W)
Francis Thompson (1859–1907, E)
John Thompson (1938–1976, E/C)
John Reuben Thompson (1823–1873, US)
Edward William Thomson (1849–1924, C)
James Thomson (1700–1748, S)
James Thomson (awa Bysshe Vanolis, 1834–1882, S)
Henry David Thoreau (1817–1862, US)
Tim Thorne (1944–2021, A)
Russell Thornton (living, C)
Joseph Thurston (1704–1732, E)
Anthony Thwaite (1930–2021, E)
Michael Thwaites (1915–2005, A)
Chidiock Tichborne (1558–1586, E)
Thomas Tickell (1685–1740, E)
Matthew Tierney (born 1970, C)
Mary Tighe (1772–1810, Ir)
Lydia H. Tilton (1839–1915, US)
Richard Tipping (born 1949, A)
José Tlatelpas (born 1953, Me/C)
Nick Toczek (born 1950, E)
Barbara Euphan Todd (1890–1976, E)
Ruthven Todd (1914–1978, S)
Mohamud Siad Togane (born 1947, So/C)
J. R. R. Tolkien (1892–1973, E)
Francis Tolson (died 1745, E)
Melvin B. Tolson (1898–1966, US)
Charles Tomlinson (1927–2015, E)
Jean Toomer (1894–1967, US)
Charles Tompson (1807–1883, A)
Angela Topping (born 1954, E)
Lola Lemire Tostevin (born 1937, C)
Cyril Tourneur (died 1626, E)
Ann Townsend (born 1962, US)
Thomas Traherne (1636/1637–1674, E)
John Tranter (born 1943, A)
Elizabeth Treadwell (born 1967, US)
Mark Tredinnick (born 1962, A)
Rhea Tregebov (born 1953, C)
Raymond D. Tremblay (living, C)
Roland Michel Tremblay (born 1972, C/E)
Natasha Trethewey (born 1966, US)
Calvin Trillin (born 1935, US)
John Tripp (1927–1986, W/E)
Quincy Troupe (born 1939, US)
Peter Trower (1930–2017, C)
Mark Truscott (born 1970, US/C)
Dimitris Tsaloumas (1921–2016, A)
Charlotte Maria Tucker (A.L.O.E, 1821–1893, E)
Eliza Dorothea Cobbe, Lady Tuite (c. 1764–1850, Ir)
George Turberville (c. 1540 – before 1597, E)
Richard Marggraf Turley (born 1970, E)
Gael Turnbull (1928–2004, S)
Charles Tennyson Turner (1808–1879, E)
Julian Turner (born 1955, E)
Walter J. Turner (1889–1946, A/E)
Thomas Tusser (1524–1580, E)
Emma Rood Tuttle (1839-1916, US)
Hone Tuwhare (1922–2008, NZ)
Violet Tweedale (1862–1936, S/E)
Chase Twichell (born 1950, US)
Katharine Tynan (1859–1932, Ir/E)
John Tyndall (born 1951, C)
Daniel Scott Tysdal (born 1978, C)

U

Laura Ulewicz (1930–2007, US)
Jeff Unaegbu (born 1979, Ni)
Unorthodox Australian Poet (Garry W. Gosney, born 1955, A)
Jean Starr Untermeyer (1886–1970, US)
Louis Untermeyer (1885–1977, US)
John Updike (1932–2009, US)
Priscila Uppal (1974–2018, C)
Allen Upward (1863–1926, E)
Joan Ure (Elizabeth Thoms Clark, 1918–1978, S)
David UU (David W. Harris, 1948–1994, C)
Amy Uyematsu (born 1947, US)

V

Jean Valentine (born 1934, US)
Valentine Vallis (1916–2009, A)
Cor van den Heuvel (born 1931, US)
Mona Van Duyn (1921–2004, US)
Lin Van Hek (born 1944, A)
Peter van Toorn (born 1944, C)
Christopher van Wyk (1957–2014, SA)
Henry Vaughan (1621–1695, W)
R. M. Vaughan (born 1965, C)
Thomas Vaux, 2nd Baron Vaux of Harrowden (1509–1556, E)
Reetika Vazirani (1962–2003, US)
Janine Pommy Vega (1942–2010, US)
Edward Vere, Earl of Oxford (1550–1604, E)
Helen Vendler (born 1933, US)
Jumoke Verissimo (born 1976, Ni)
Paul Vermeersch (born 1973, C)
Katherena Vermette (born 1977, C)
Jones Very (1813–1880, US)
Vicki Viidikas (1948–1998, A)
Peter Viereck (1916–2006, US)
José García Villa (1908–1997, Ph)
Pamelia Sarah Vining (1826–1897, C)
Vivian Virtue (1911–1998, J/E)
Garth Von Buchholz (living, C)
Brian Vrepont (1882–1955, A)
Prvoslav Vujcic (Prvoslav Vujčić, born 1960, Se/C)

W

Wa–We
Miriam Waddington (1917–2004, C)
Michael Wade (1944–2004, C)
Sidney Wade (born 1951, US)
Fred Wah (born 1939, C)
John Wain (1925–1994, E)
A. E. Waite (1857–1942, E)
Nayyirah Waheed (living, US)
Diane Wakoski (born 1937, US)
Derek Walcott (1930–2017, SL)
Anne Waldman (born 1945, US)
George Waldron (1690 – c. 1730, E/IoM)
Keith Waldrop (born 1932, US)
Rosmarie Waldrop (born 1935, US)
Arthur Waley (1889–1966, E)
Alice Walker (born 1944, US)
Margaret Walker (1915–1998, US)
Rob Walker (born 1953, A)
Bronwen Wallace (1945–1989, C)
Chris Wallace-Crabbe (born 1934, A)
Edmund Waller (1606–1687, E)
Tom Walmsley (born 1948, C)
Agnes Walsh (born 1950, C)
Catherine Walsh (born 1964, Ir)
Minnie Gow Walsworth (1859-1947, US)
David Waltner-Toews (born 1948, C)
Ania Walwicz (1951–2020, A)
Connie Wanek (born 1952, US)
John Powell Ward (born 1937, E/W)
Ned Ward (1667–1731, E)
Sarah Wardle (born 1969, E)
Anna Laetitia Waring (1823–1910, W/E)
Emily Warn (living, US)
Sylvia Townsend Warner (1893–1978, E)
Crystal Warren (living, SA)
John Warren, 3rd Baron de Tabley (1835–1895, E)
Meralda Warren (born 1959, PI)
Robert Penn Warren (1905–1989, US)
Thomas Warton (1728–1790, E)
Terry Watada (living, C)
Vernon Watkins (1906–1967, W)
George Watsky (born 1986, US)
Rosamund Marriott Watson (Graham R. Tomson, 1860–1911, E)
Samuel Wagan Watson (born 1972, A)
Stephen Watson (1954–2011, SA)
Thomas Watson (1555–1592, E)
William Watson (1858–1935, E)
Alison Watt (born 1957, C)
Barrett Watten (born 1948, US)
Isaac Watts (1674–1748, E)
Rebecca Watts (born 1983, E)
Theodore Watts-Dunton (1832–1914, E)
Tom Wayman (born 1945, C)
Alan Wearne (born 1948, A)
Francis Webb (1925–1973, A)
Harri Webb (1920–1994, W)
Phyllis Webb (born 1927, C)
John Webster (c. 1580 – c. 1634, E)
Mary Morison Webster (1894–1980, SA)
James Wedderburn (c. 1495–1553, S)
John Wedderburn (c. 1505–1553, S)
Robert Wedderburn (c. 1510 – c. 1555, S)
Rebecca Wee (living, US)
George Weideman (1947–2008, SA)
John Weier (born 1949, C)
Hannah Weiner (1928–1997, US)
Robert Stanley Weir (1856–1926, C)
Marjorie Welish (born 1944, US)
Zachariah Wells (born 1976, C)
Viola S. Wendt (1907–1986, US)
Marjory Heath Wentworth (born 1958, US)
William Wentworth (1790–1872, A)
Darren Wershler (Darren Wershler-Henry, born 1966, C)
Charles Wesley (1707–1788, E)
Gilbert West (1703–1756, E)
Jane West (1758–1852, E)
David Wevill (born 1935, C/US)

Wh–Wy
Philip Whalen (1923–2002, US)
Dawud Wharnsby (born 1972, C)
Anne Wharton (1659–1685, E)
Gordon Wharton (born 1929, E)
Herb Wharton (born 1936, A)
Mary Whateley (1738–1835, E)
David Wheatley (born 1970, Ir/S)
Phillis Wheatley (1753–1784, US)
Billy Edd Wheeler (born 1932, US)
E. B. White (1899–1985, US)
Henry Kirke White (1785–1806, E)
James L. White (1936–1981, US)
Kenneth White (born 1936, S)
Laura Rosamond White (1844–1922, US)
Joshua Whitehead (living, C)
Bruce Whiteman (born 1952, C)
Walt Whitman (1819–1892, US)
Isabella Whitney (c. 1546/1548 – after 1624, E)
Zoe Whittall (born 1976, C)
Reed Whittemore (1919–2012, US)
John Greenleaf Whittier (1807–1892, US)
Brian Whittingham (born 1950, S)
Christopher Whyte (born 1952, S)
George Whyte-Melville (1821–1878, S/E)
Anna Wickham (1883–1947, E/A)
Les Wicks (born 1955, A)
John Wieners (1934–2002, US)
Nissanka Wijeyeratne (1924–2007, SLa)
Richard Wilbur (1921–2017, US)
Dora Wilcox (1873–1953, A)
Ella Wheeler Wilcox (1850–1919, US)
Robert Will (1615–1679, E)
Jane Wilde (1821–1896, Ir/E)
Oscar Wilde (1854–1900, Ir/E)
Amos Wilder (1895–1993, US)
Charlotte Wilder (1898–1980, US)
Anne Wilkinson (1910–1961, C)
John Wilkinson (born 1953, E)
William of Nassyngton (died 1354, E)
William of Shoreham (fl. 14th century, E)
Aeneas Francon Williams (1886–1971, E)
Alfred Williams (1877–1930, E)
Anna Williams (1706–1783, W/E)
Athol Williams (born 1970, SA)
C. K. Williams (1936–2015, US)
David Gwyn Williams (1904–1990, W/E)
Donna Williams (1963–2017, A)
Emmett Williams (1925–2007, US)
Heathcote Williams (1941–2017, E)
Helen Maria Williams (1759/1762–1827, E/F)
Hugo Williams (born 1942, E)
Isaac Williams (1802–1865, E)
Jane Williams (1806–1885, W/E)
Jonathan Williams (1929–2008, US)
Miller Williams (1930–2015, US)
Oscar Williams (1900–1964, US)
Richard D'Alton Williams (1822–1862, Ir)
Rowan Williams (born 1950, W/E)
Saul Williams (born 1972, US)
Sherley Anne Williams (1944–1999, US)
William Carlos Williams (1883–1963, US)
Frank S. Williamson (1865–1936, A)
Elizabeth Willis (born 1961, US)
James Wills (1790–1868, Ir)
Clive Wilmer (born 1945, E)
Frank Wilmot (Furnley Maurice, 1881–1942, A)
John Wilmot, 2nd Earl of Rochester (1647–1680, E)
Eleanor Wilner (born 1937, US)
Alan R. Wilson (living, C)
Anne Elizabeth Wilson (1901-1946, US/C)
Arthur Wilson (1595–1652, E)
Dede Wilson (born 1937, US)
Edwin Wilson (born 1942, A)
Florence Mary Wilson (c. 1870–1946, Ir/NI)
Peter Lamborn Wilson (also Hakim Bey, born 1945, US)
Sheri-D Wilson (living, C)
Christian Wiman (born 1966, US)
Liz Winfield (born 1964, A)
Rob Winger (born 1974, C)
Sheila Wingfield (1906–1992, E/Ir)
Yvor Winters (1900–1968, US)
Jane Wiseman (Mrs. Holt, 1673 – after 1717, E)
George Wither (1588–1667, E)
Charles Wolfe (1791–1823, Ir)
Humbert Wolfe (1885–1940, E)
Thomas Wolfe (1900–1938, US)
Theresa Wolfwood (living, C)
Jennifer Wong (living, HK)
Nellie Wong (born 1934, US)
Gwyneth Barber Wood (died 2006, J)
George Woodcock (1912–1995, C)
Gregory Woods (born 1953, E)
Joseph Woods (born 1966, Ir/Z)
Macdara Woods (1942–2018, Ir)
Lance Woolaver (born 1948, C)
Dorothy Wordsworth (1771–1855, E)
William Wordsworth (1770–1850, E)
Philip Stanhope Worsley (1835–1866, E)
Sir Henry Wotton (1568–1639, E)
Carolyn D. Wright (born 1949, US)
Carolyne Wright (born 1949, US)
Charles Wright (born 1935, US)
David Wright (1920–1994, E)
David McKee Wright (1869–1928, NZ/A)
Franz Wright (1953–2015, US)
James Wright (1927–1980, US)
Jay Wright (born 1935, US)
Judith Wright (1915–2000, A)
Kirby Wright (living, US)
Luke Wright (born 1982, E)
Robert Wrigley (born 1951, US)
Lady Mary Wroth (1587–1651 or 1653)
Thomas Wyatt (1503–1542, E)
Elinor Wylie (1885–1928, US)
Edward Alexander Wyon (1842–1872, E)

X–Y

Makhosazana Xaba (born 1957, SA)
Mitsuye Yamada (born 1923, US)
Leo Yankevich (1961–2018, US)
Morgan Yasbincek (born 1964, A)
J. Michael Yates (1938–2021, US/C)
W. B. Yeats (1865–1939, Ir)
Jean Yoon (born 1962, C)
Marly Youmans (born 1953, US)
Monica Youn (born 1971, US)
Andrew Young (1885–1971, S)
Augustus Young (born 1943, Ir)
d'bi Young (born 1977, J/C)
Douglas Young (1913–1973, S)
Edward Young (1683–1765, E)
Ellen Young (c. 1810–1872, A)
Ian Young (born 1945, C)
Kevin Young (born 1970, US)
Marguerite Young (1908–1995, US)

Z

Matthew Zapruder (born 1967, US)
Marya Zaturenska (1902–1982, US)
Robert Zend (1929–1985, C)
Benjamin Zephaniah (born 1958, E)
Komninos Zervos (born 1950, A)
David Zieroth (born 1946, C)
Rachel Zolf (born 1968, C)
Daniel Zomparelli (living, C)
Carolyn Zonailo (born 1947, C)
Louis Zukofsky (1904–1978, US)
Fay Zwicky (1933–2017, A)
Jan Zwicky (born 1955, C)

Lists of English language poets by nationality
List of Australian poets
List of Canadian poets
List of Irish poets
List of English poets from India
List of Nigerian poets
List of South African poets
List of poets from the United States

See also
English poetry
List of poets
List of women poets

References

Lists of poets by language